= List of migrant vessel incidents on the Mediterranean Sea =

Migrant vessel sinkings in the Mediterranean Sea

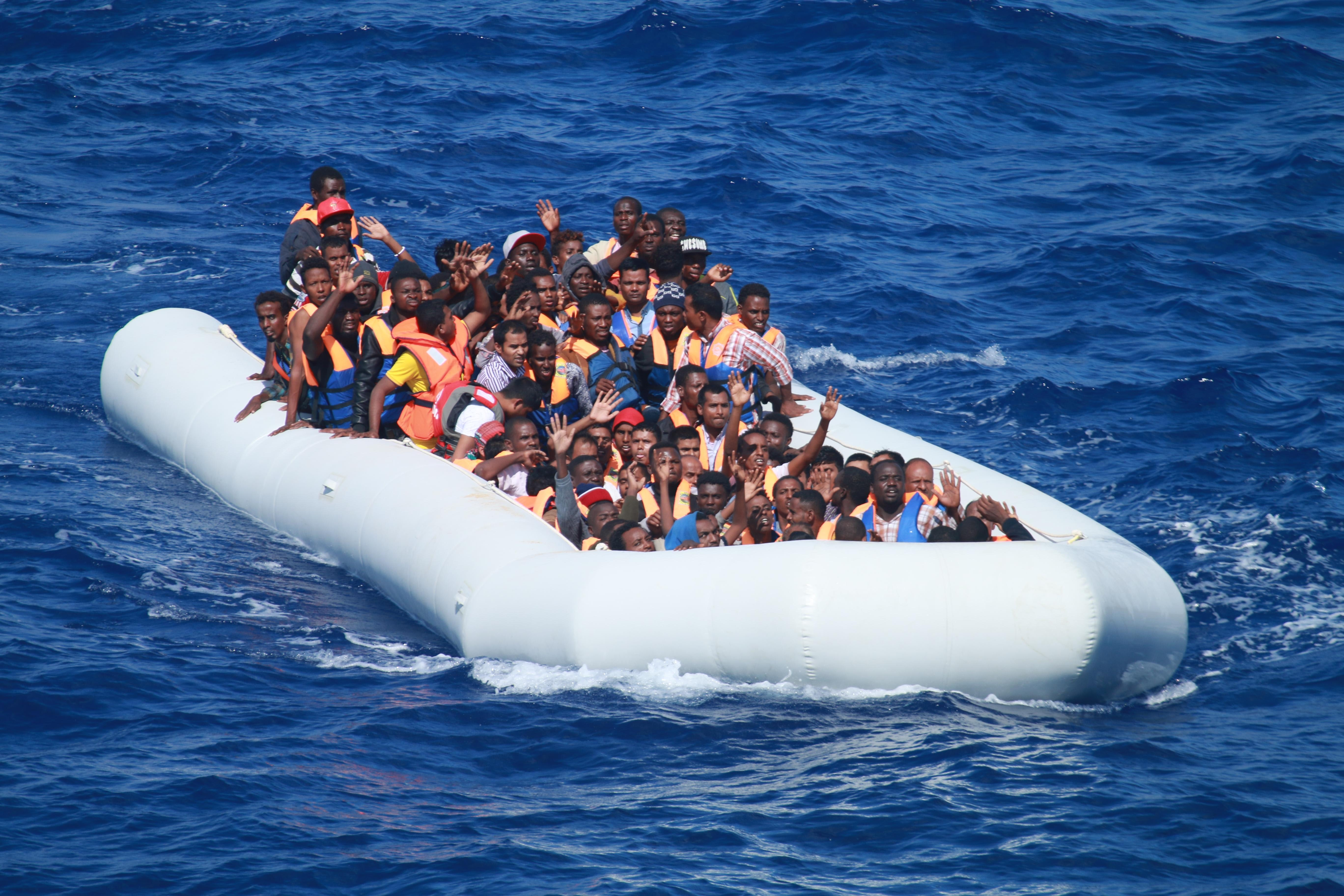
Migrants aboard an inflatable vessel before their rescue co-ordinated by USS Carney near Spain in February 2013

This list of migrant vessel incidents on the Mediterranean Sea includes those resulting from the european border policies and the construction of the Fortress Europe with migration flows linked to developments such as the Arab Spring protests (2010–2012), the civil wars in Syria (since 2011) and Libya (2014–2020), and emerging conflicts in Sudan, Niger, Israel, and Palestine in 2023.

Over 28,000 people have died or have been declared missing while in migration across the Mediterranean Sea since 2014. The 'Deaths at the Border' project at the University of Amsterdam estimates that a further 3,188 people died while trying to reach Europe between 1990 and 2013.

By comparison, a total of 609 people lost their lives in maritime accidents between 2011 and 2021 which involved vessels registered by European Union countries or other registered vessels in EU waters.

This marked the beginning of what the media and politicians have termed the ‘migration crisis’. Following the exodus of millions of Syrians in 2015, European governments adopted a new border management strategy. The term ‘migration crisis’, which emerged at the same time, should, however, be viewed with caution, as it implies that the so-called ‘irregular’ arrivals of people at Europe’s borders are an unprecedented and unpredictable phenomenon. Yet the shift in European migration policies in the 1970s, brought about by the Schengen Agreements, made it possible to anticipate this ‘migration crisis’. Thus, Ruben Andersson highlights this paradox of European states which, in seeking to combat immigration, actually produce the very thing they hope to reduce: forms of illegal migration. This is why Annalisa Lendaro, amongst others, prefers to speak of a ‘reception crisis’, or even a ‘crisis of solidarity’ and of states’ capacity to respond.

== Routes and context ==
=== Mediterranean routes ===
The International Organization for Migration (IOM) has identified three key routes through which migrants in the region travel into Europe by sea or, in some cases, in journeys along coasts:

- the Central Mediterranean route from North Africa (mainly Libya and Tunisia) to Italy and, to a lesser degree, Malta;
- the Western Mediterranean route from Morocco and Algeria to Spain (including Ceuta and Melila);
- the Eastern Mediterranean route from Turkey to Greece and, to a lesser degree, Cyprus and Bulgaria.

Journeys before these crossings also carry a high risk for the people involved as they include crossing remote and harsh terrains, such as the Sahara Desert, and residing in countries in conflict such as Libya and Syria, where civil wars with international intervention have led to considerable forced migration since the Arab Spring.

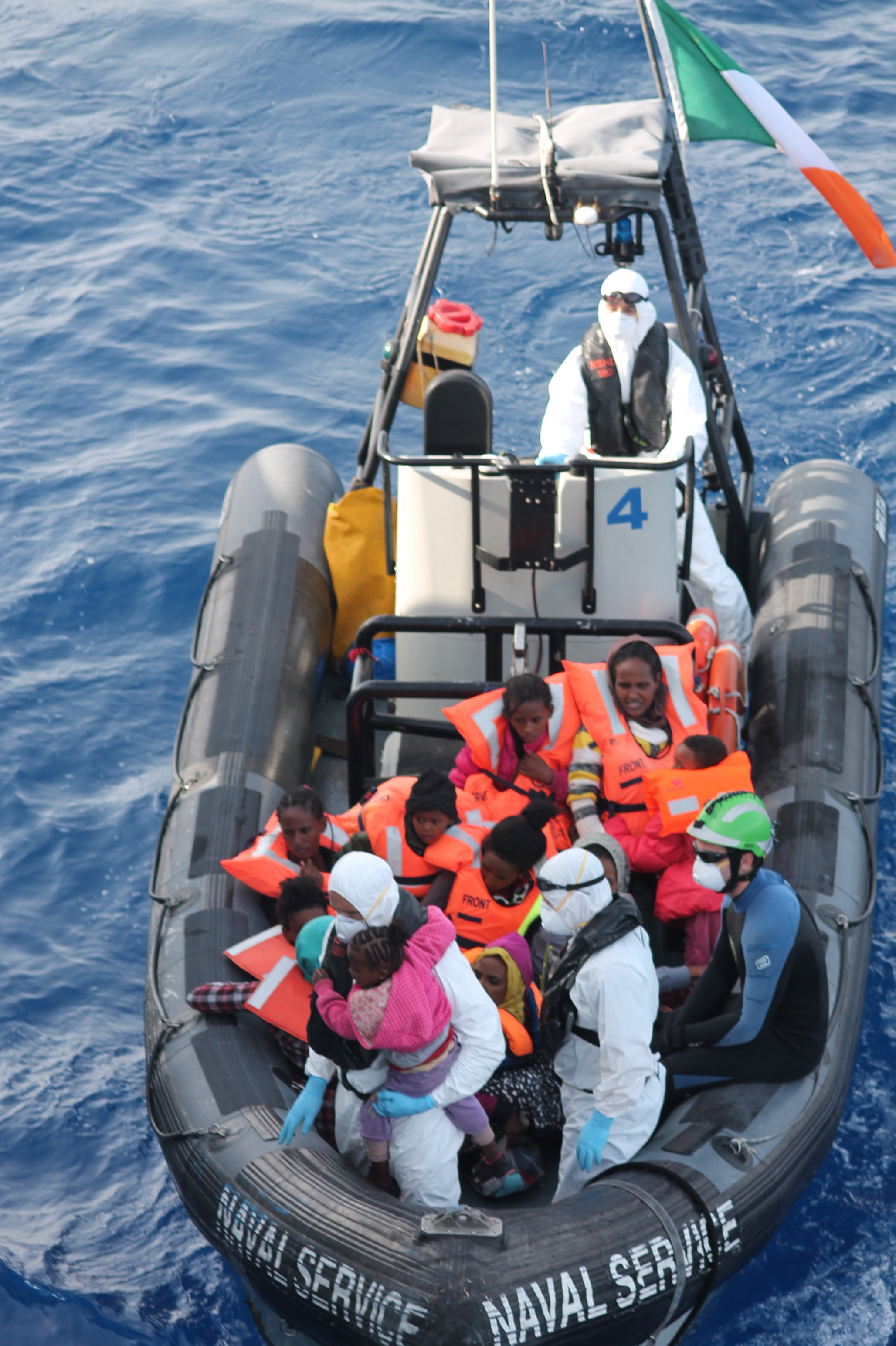
Women and children rescued by the Irish Naval Service patrol vessel LÉ Eithne during Operation Triton in June 2015, off Libya.

Economic differences between the countries on the shores of the Mediterranean also contribute to economic migration to Europe as people seek higher wages and a better quality of life for themselves and their families. IMF data for 2023 provides the following ranking in gross domestic product (GDP) per capita, adjusted for purchasing power parity (PPP), in countries on major routes:

- Malta – $61,939
- Cyprus – $54,611
- Italy – $54,216
- Spain – $49,448
- Libya – $24,599
- Algeria – $13,507
- Tunisia – $13,270
- Morocco – $10,460

GDP per capita in Turkey ($41,412) and Greece ($39,478) is comparable, although the Aegean Sea is a transit route for migrants from elsewhere. Southern Italy and Andalusia are, by this measure, similar to North Africa ($17,000-18,000) although the Schengen zone allows for further northward migration.

Countries beyond immediate countries of origin experience considerable conflict and widespread poverty (and, increasingly, climate change) within a relatively short journey time to Europe. Some of the world's lowest living standards are experienced in Syria ($6,374 per capita GDP at pre-war levels), Sudan ($4,471) and Niger (£1,600).

=== Wider context ===
Migration routes via the Middle East from the Horn of Africa to Yemen, and routes through the Atlantic departing from the west coast of Africa, have also seen many fatalities.

== 1990–2015 ==
During the Cold War, migration by land or sea in the region was limited (or highly regulated) by the presence of authoritarian regimes but also facilitated by relatively generous safe and legal immigration routes into Western Europe. In the years from 1990 onwards, migration across the Mediterranean Sea and Adriatic Sea increased for both economic reasons (with people travelling from developing countries in Africa and Asia) and as a result of conflict.

For example, several conflicts in Africa, the Yugoslav Wars (1991–2001), the Algerian Civil War (1991–2002), and the 1997 civil unrest in Albania prompted several million people to leave or consider leaving their home countries as refugees. The events of the Arab Spring had a similar effect early in the second decade of the 21st century, especially as a result of wars in Syria and Libya.

The loss of European ships, such as the Costa Concordia in 2012, received substantially more public and media attention than that of migrant vessels during this time.

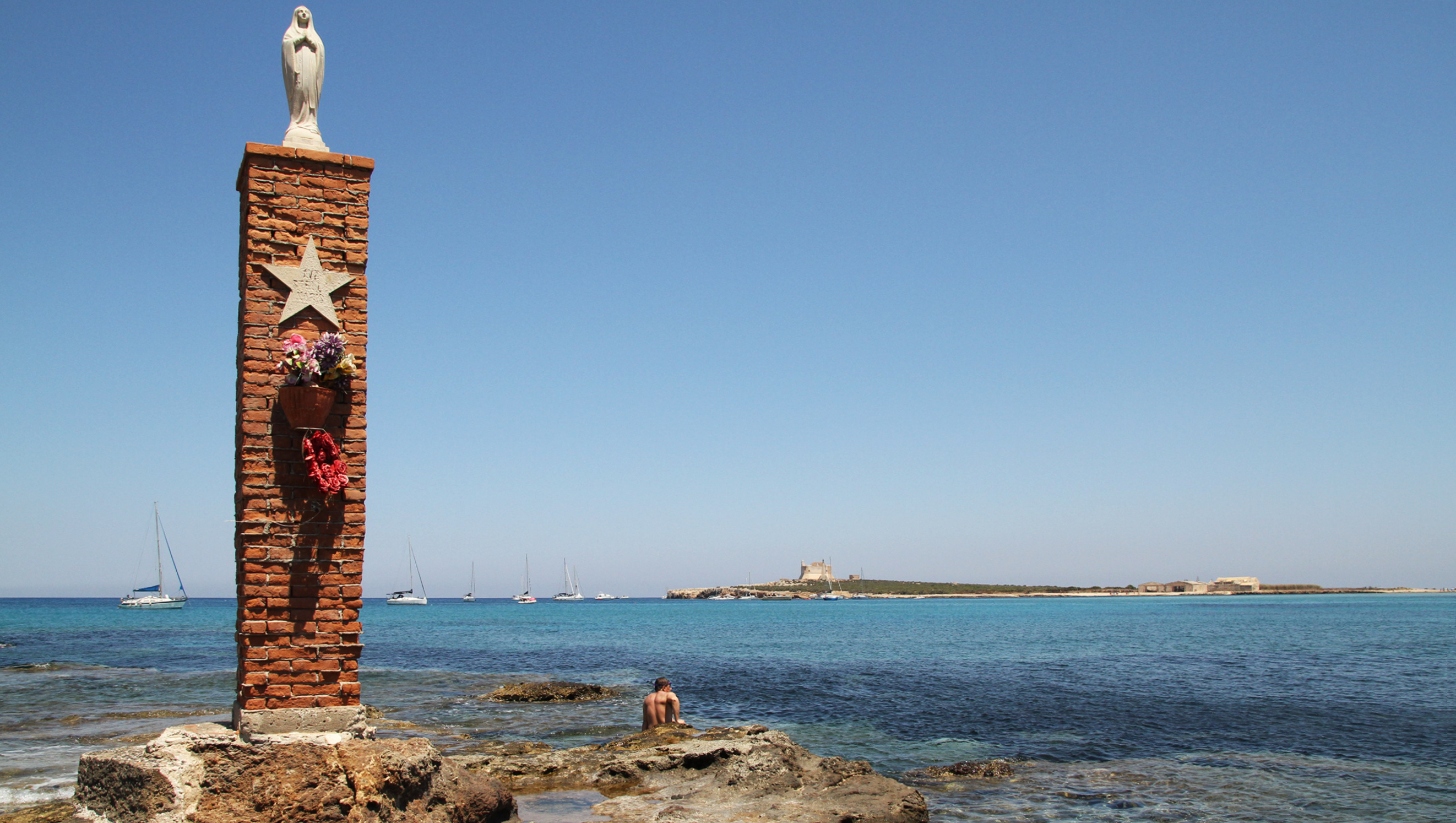
Memorial at Capo Passero, Sicily, for the sinking of the wooden ship F174 at Christmas 1996, resulting in over 280 lost lives

Pope Francis, however, highlighted the plight of migrants in 2013 when he visited Lampedusa, a southern Italian island which frequently serves as a reception centre for migrants. He remarked: "These brothers and sisters of ours were trying to escape difficult situations to find some serenity and peace; they were looking for a better place for themselves and their families, but instead they found death. How often do such people fail to find understanding, fail to find acceptance, fail to find solidarity. And their cry rises up to God."

2014 was a turning point in terms of scale of migrants dying or going missing during crossing attempts, although that does not diminish the sense of loss experienced by families and in home communities in previous times. In that year, 3,538 people died or went missing at sea according to UNHCR statistics; 3,289 dead or missing persons were recorded by the IOM's Missing Migrants Project. In trends repeated year on year from then onwards, most loss of life occurred in the Central Mediterranean area between Italy, Libya, Malta and Tunisia (but not exclusively) and mainly due to drowning (although with other accidents and causes also present). (Note: UNHCR's online dashboard with summary information about people dead or missing at sea in the Mediterranean is presented via data2.unhcr.org here) (Note: IOM's Missing Migrants Project collects information from a range of verified sources, which may at times vary from UNHCR sources; information for the Mediterranean region is published at missingmigrants.iom.int here)

Around 500 people died during the 2014 Malta migrant shipwreck on 11 September 2014. The eleven survivors included Doaa Al Zamel, whose story is featured in the 2017 book, A Hope More Powerful than the Sea.

Date	Location	Passengers	Confirmed deaths	Missing	Known survivors
21 May 2007	off Malta	53	0	53	0
27 March 2009	off Libya	cca. 250	98	cca. 131	21
March/April 2009	off Libya	cca. 250	0	cca. 250	0
March/April 2009	off Libya	cca. 250	0	cca. 250	0
6 April 2011	off Lampedusa	cca. 300	20	130+	51
3 October 2013	off Lampedusa	500+	359	30+	155
11 October 2013	off Lampedusa	200+	34	20+	147
30 June 2014	off Pozzallo	~600	45	0	566
11 September 2014	off Malta	500+	0	500+	11
15 September 2014	off Libya	cca. 250	0	cca. 250	36

== 2015 ==
Sinking of migrant vessels in 2015
- List of migrant vessel incidents on the Mediterranean Sea (Mediterranean)
- Date: 2015
- Cause: Vessels capsized
- Outcome: Sinkings of several vessels, search and rescue operations
- Deaths: 1,555
- Missing: 2,216 (UNHCR estimate)

The year 2015 became the most significant in the crisis until that time, in terms of people dying or missing while migrating across the Mediterranean Sea, accompanied by a major increase in international public and media attention. A total of 3,771 deaths or incidents of individual missing persons were recorded by the UNHCR – 2,216 missing and 1,555 found dead.

The Central Mediterranean accounted for the majority of casualties – 2,911 people – followed by 793 in the Eastern Mediterranean and 67 in the Western Mediterranean.

The IOM estimates that the total number of dead and missing people was higher, at 4,055 persons, although in similar locations by route – 3,149 in the Central region, 804 in the Eastern region, and 102 in the Western region – and 3,737 by drowning and 113 through related accidents.

=== April ===
On 13 April 2015, a vessel sank off the Libyan coast with up to 550 migrants on board. More than 400 people are believed to have drowned. 144–150 people were rescued and were taken to a hospital in Southern Italy. The capsizing occurred 60 nautical miles (110 km) off the Libyan coast.

Air and sea search operations started in the location of the shipwreck, looking for survivors. Nine bodies were recovered; the Italian Coast Guard stated that "no more survivors have been found".

On 16 April, four immigrants arriving in Sicily said they were the only survivors of a sunken ship. They said that 41 people had drowned when their vessel overturned and sank shortly after departing from Libya. In an unrelated incident, 15 people were arrested in Sicily following reports that they had thrown 12 other passengers overboard, causing them to drown. According to eyewitnesses, a fight had broken out between Christian and Muslim groups on a boat that left Libya on 14 April, resulting in 12 Christians being thrown overboard.

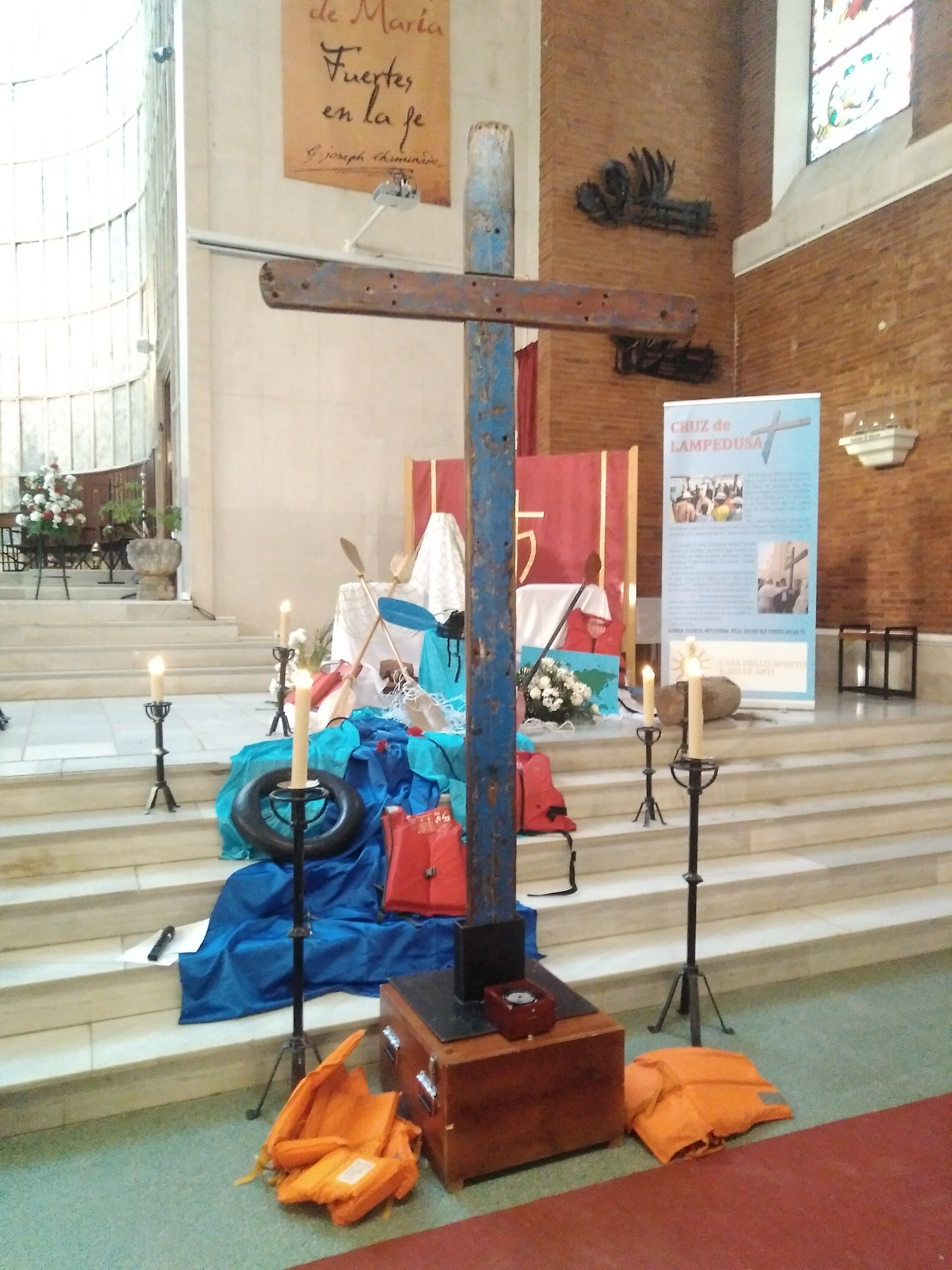
Cross made with wood of broken immigration boats in Lampedusa

On Saturday, 18 April, a boat that had just left the port city of Zuwarah, Tripoli, capsized off the Libyan coast during the night, with up to 850 migrants aboard. 28 people were rescued. The incident happened 60 miles (97 km) off the Libyan coast and 120 miles (190 km) south of the southern Italian island, Lampedusa. The boat may have capsized when people on board moved to one side when a ship approached. Italian prosecutors say that a Bangladeshi survivor estimated 950 people were on board, and smugglers locked hundreds of the migrants in the ship's hold. Among the people on board were about 350 Eritreans, 200 Senegalese, as well as migrants from Syria, Somalia, Sierra Leone, Mali, Gambia, Ivory Coast and Ethiopia. The Maltese Navy and Italian Coast Guard began mounting a rescue operation. Despite 18 ships joining the rescue effort, only 28 survivors and 24 bodies were pulled from the water by nightfall. This incident is cited by some as the shipwreck with the highest death toll in the history of the Mediterranean. In June 2016, Italian Navy conducted a recovery operation and raised the boat from a depth of 370 metres (1,214 ft) by a specially designed robotic apparatus. The wreck was brought to a port in Sicily by the MPSV Levoli Ivory and was kept in a refrigerated transport structure. Over the course of twelve days, Italian fire officers recovered human remains. Among other incidents, however, the sinking of the SS Oria in 1944, with a death toll of over 4,000, claimed more lives.

On 21 April Italian officials reported that the Tunisian captain of the boat had been charged with reckless multiple homicide. It was also reported that the children on board had drowned because they were trapped on the boat's lower two levels.

The Italian Navy, at the request of the Prosecutor of Catania, has made available the minesweepers Gaeta and Vieste, along with the corvette Sfinge, for search and localization of the vessel sank.

On 7 May 2015 a wreck with a length of 25 metres was located approximately 85 miles north east of the Libyan coast at a depth of 375 metres. The Italian Navy said it was correlated with the wreck of the vessel sank on 18 April.

A boat carrying migrants reportedly sank off the east coast of Rhodes, Greece on 20 April, after striking a reef. Initial reports suggested that there had been at least three deaths. 93 people were rescued from the water, with 30 individuals hospitalized. In contrast to the other wrecked ships, which have come from Libya, this boat had departed from Turkey.

Two further reports of ships in distress in the waters between Libya and Italy appeared on 20 April. It was stated that one boat contained up to 150 people, with the other containing up to 300. The precise locations of these boats was not revealed, and it was unclear whether these reports refer to separate vessels. The Italian and Maltese navies are reported as having responded to these calls. On Tuesday 21 April it was reported that all 450 passengers had been rescued, despite initial reports of deaths.

=== May ===
Rescue operations and landings of migrants continued on the coasts of Sicily and Calabria. The ship Phoenix arrived in Pozzallo carrying 369 migrants. Another 675 people landed in Augusta and 300 were rescued off the coast of Calabria. A container ship Zeran arrived in Catania with 197 people; there were five dead bodies. According to Save the Children 40 other immigrants lost their lives at sea.

In Crotone the Panamanian tanker Prince I brought 250 migrants rescued from the Channel of Sicily; the bodies of three others, two women and a man, were recovered at sea during a rescue.

Meanwhile, there was also alarm over diseases: about 150 of the 675 migrants who arrived on the Italian navy ship Vega in Augusta were put in isolation in the port for suspected cases of chickenpox and scabies. Under these conditions doctors considered there is no danger of further contagion. Most patients arriving were debilitated before the voyage by a wait of two months in warehouses in Libya with little food and water.

In Trapani, 104 immigrants arrived on a cargo ship; another 483 arrived in Palermo on the Italian Navy ship Borsini. This also led to a growth of the number of smugglers arrested by the Italian police forces.

Off the coast of Calabria, a rescue operation rescued about 300 migrants aboard a fishing vessel with poor buoyancy about 80 miles from the coast of Calabria.

The Italian Navy rescued 217 migrants and recovered 17 migrants who were aboard boats adrift in the channel of Sicily on 29 May 2015. 3,300 more migrants were rescued in the following 24 hours.

=== July ===
283 migrants aboard three boats were rescued by the German warship Schleswig-Holstein a few miles from the Libyan coast and landed in the port of Augusta in Sicily. 40 people were missing or dead according to the testimonies of survivors.

=== August ===
On 19 August, 49 migrants were killed by fumes while packed into the ship’s hold and prevented from exiting the hold by the ship's crew off the coast of Libya. Survivors were rescued by the Italian Navy and the ship's captain and crew were arrested.

Six migrants drowned off the coast of Turkey attempting to reach a Greek island.

On 26 August 50 migrants were killed by fumes while packed into the hold and prevented from exiting by the ship's crew off the coast of Libya; another 439 migrants on board were rescued by a Swedish unit.

=== September ===
A further 96 confirmed deaths were recorded in September 2015.

=== Summary of major incidents in 2015 ===
Date	Location	Passengers	Confirmed deaths	Missing	Known survivors
13 April	off Libya	cca. 550	9	400+	144–150
19 April	off Libya	cca. 850	24	800+	28
20 April	off Rhodes	96	3	0	93
3 May	off Libya	3500 (multiple vessels)	10+	?	?
5 May	off Catania	Unknown	5	40+	197
5 May	off Crotone	250+	3	Unknown	250
29 May	off Lampedusa	234+	17	Unknown	217
23 July	off Libya	300+	40+	40+	283
27 July	off Libya	522	13	?	?
1 August	off Libya	780	5	?	?
5 August	off Libya	370	26	200	?
11 August	off Libya	120	50	50+	?
15 August	off Libya	cca. 400	49	0	cca. 350
18 August	off Turkey	Unknown	6	Unknown	0
25 August	off Libya	cca. 450	50	0	cca. 400
27 August	off Libya	?	160	200+	?
30 August	off Libya	?	7	?	?
1 September	off Kos	?	11	?	?
6 September	off Lampedusa	?	20	?	?
13 September	off Farmakonissi	112	34	?	?
15 September	off Turkey	250	22	?	?
30 September	off Lesbos	?	2	11 ?	45

== 2016 ==
2016 marked the highest number of deaths and disappearances at sea – 5,096 as recorded by the UNHCR. The majority of these casualties were caused in incidents in the Central region (resulting in 4,234 persons dead or missing), followed by the Eastern region (760 persons), and the Western region (102 persons). Information gathered by the IOM found a similar total of 5,136 persons dead or missing at sea including 4,498 by drowning.

On 21 September 2016, a boat capsized off the Egyptian coast with around 600 migrants on board in the Mediterranean Sea. 204 bodies were recovered (including at least 30 children) and around 160 people were rescued. Many people remain missing, with approximately 300 people predicted to have died. Four people were arrested for trafficking and breaking capacity laws. The incident may be the worst this year in the Mediterranean Sea.

On 3 November, around 240 people died in two migrant boat capsizing incidents off the coast of Libya. 29 people survived the first wreck with about 120 deaths reported. Only two people survived the second wreck with again around 120 deaths reported. Another 100 people are believed to have drowned off the coast when their boat sank after they were abandoned off Libya without a motor on 17 November. 27 survivors were transported to Italy. An estimated 4,700 people have died trying to cross the Mediterranean Sea in 2016.

== 2017 ==
In 2017, the number of people who died or were declared missing at sea remained tragically high, despite being lower than in each of the two preceding years. According to the United Nations High Commissioner for Refugees (UNHCR), an estimated 3,139 people lost their lives or went missing while attempting to cross the Mediterranean. Of this figure, 2,344 individuals were reported as missing, while 795 were confirmed dead.

The Central Mediterranean route accounted for the vast majority of these casualties, with 2,874 deaths or disappearances. This route, often utilized by migrants attempting to reach Europe from North Africa, has long been recognized as one of the most dangerous migratory paths in the world. In contrast, the Eastern Mediterranean saw a significant decrease in fatalities, with only 56 people recorded as dead or missing. The Western Mediterranean, however, accounted for 209 deaths or disappearances. These figures highlight the ongoing peril faced by migrants attempting these dangerous journeys.

The International Organization for Migration (IOM) corroborated these estimates, recording a similar total of 3,139 deaths and disappearances. The IOM also noted that 2,891 of these deaths were due to drowning, further emphasizing the hazardous nature of these sea crossings.

Throughout 2017, the death toll fluctuated monthly, with a peak occurring in May, when 623 individuals lost their lives. June followed closely behind, with 539 reported dead or missing. Tragically, there was at least one significant maritime disaster, resulting in more than 20 casualties, recorded every month of the year, except for December. These statistics serve as a sobering reminder of the extreme risks that migrants face in their search for safety and better opportunities, particularly on the treacherous Mediterranean routes.

== 2018 ==
The number of casualties continued to decrease in 2018 although it remained substantial at 2,270 deaths and disappearances. A total of 1,600 people were missing at sea and 670 found dead after a sinking.

This year continued to see significant loss of life in the Central Mediterranean (1,279 dead or missing persons estimated by the UNHCR) and the Western Mediterranean (804 deaths or missing person incidents), and 187 in the Eastern region. The Missing Migrants Project recorded 2,337 migrants as dead or missing, including 2,214 in drowning incidents.

On 8 October, Italian authorities rescued 22 Europe-bound migrants from a boat carrying around 50 people. At the time of the rescue, the bodies of 13 women were also found and it was later revealed that others were still missing. On 16 October, Italian authorities found the bodies of at least 12 people who had died in the incident.

In November, Italian coast guards rescued 149 Europe-bound migrants after their boat capsized on 23 November. Italian coast guards found five dead bodies afterwards and confirmed the death toll from the incident totaled at least 18.

== 2019 ==
UNHCR statistics record that 1,335 people died or were declared missing on migration routes in the Mediterranean Sea in 2019 – of whom 1,063 were missing and 272 found dead. Most of these casualties occurred on the Central route (754), followed by the Western route (510) and the Eastern route (74).

The IOM Missing Migrants Project has indicated a higher total – of 1,885 people dead and missing at sea – although with similar trends for location of casualties: 1,262 in the Central region, 552 in the Western region, and 71 in the Eastern region. In total, there were 1,795 drownings and 90 deaths caused otherwise or where the cause was not known.

== 2020 ==
The UNHCR recorded that 1,409 people died or were declared missing on Mediterranean migration routes in 2020 – 839 missing and 570 found dead. As in the previous year, most casualties occurred on the Central route (955), followed by the Western route (241) and the Eastern route (105).

A similar number was recorded by the Missing Migrants Project – i.e. 1,449 dead or missing persons, of whom 1,000 lost their lives in the Central region, 343 in the Western region, and 106 in the Eastern region. Most incidents took place later in the year as all international travel was restricted in lockdowns during the COVID-19 pandemic, and 1,375 deaths were attributed to drowning.

== 2021 ==
Trends in casualties in 2021 returned to those experienced in 2018, with a total of 2,078 people recorded as dead or missing by the UNHCR – 1,214 missing and 864 found dead.

75% of casualties took place in the Central Mediterranean (1,545) with 418 in Western region and 115 in the Eastern region. This broadly corresponded with the 2,048 people recorded as dead or missing by the Missing Migrants Project, in similar locations or estimated locations, with almost all (2,011) losing their lives in drowning incidents.

== 2022 ==
Further increases in casualties resulting from sinkings took place in 2022, when 2,439 people died or went missing at sea according to UNHCR sources – 1,452 in the Central Mediterranean, 653 in the Western Mediterranean, and 343 in the Eastern Mediterranean. A similar total of 2,411 people was recorded by the Missing Migrants Project with 2,262 drownings reported or estimated.

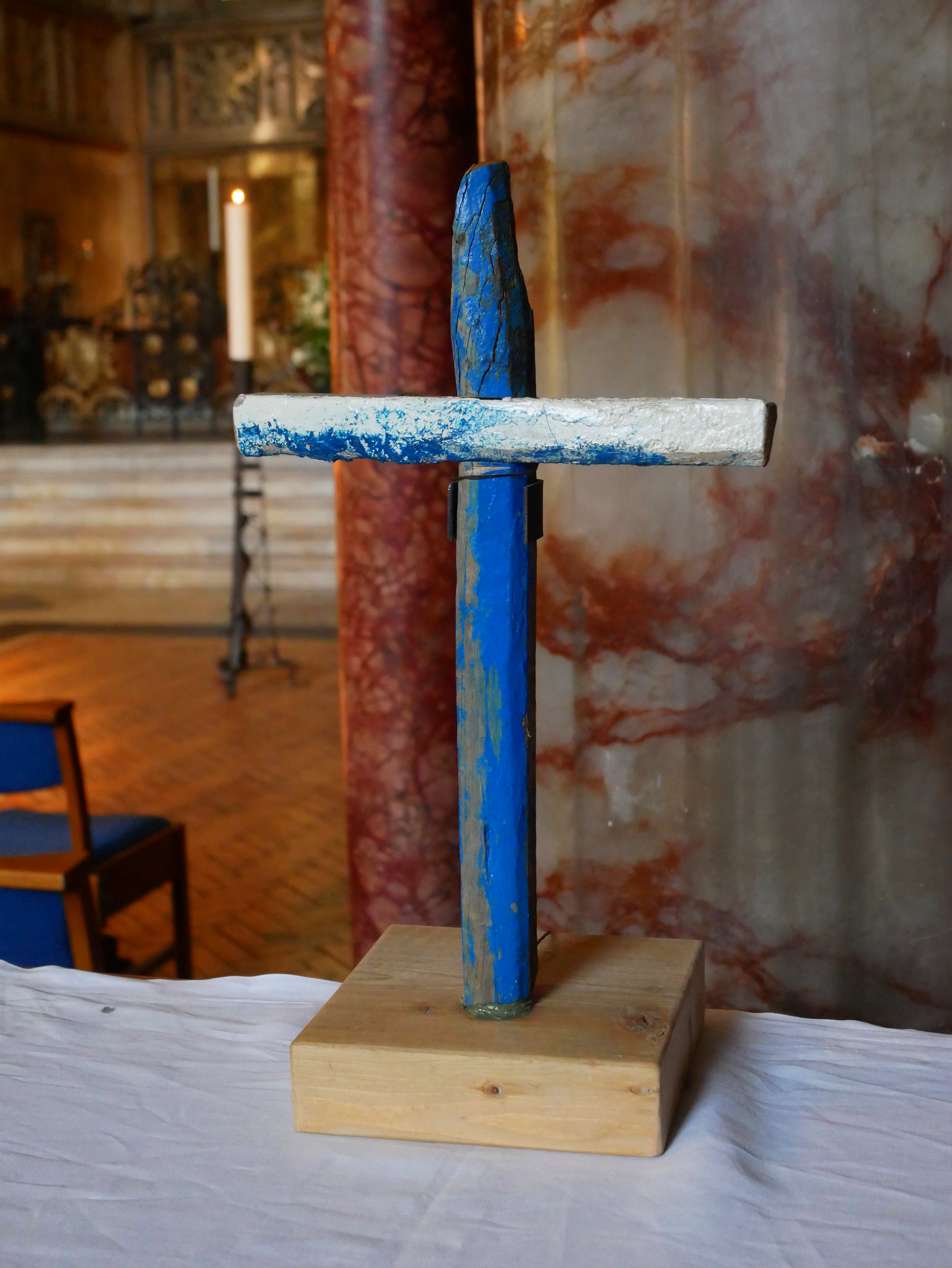
A small cross pictured in a London church in 2022, made from the timbers of boats transporting migrants from North Africa.

== 2023 ==
From January to December 2023, the UNHCR recorded that 3,160 people died or were declared missing at sea on Mediterranean migration routes; of these, 1,086 people were confirmed dead and a further 2,074 reported as missing. The majority of deaths and disappearances took place in the Central Mediterranean (1,908), followed by the Eastern Mediterranean (799) and Western Mediterranean (453). the IOM recorded 3,105 deaths or disappearances over the same year.

An attempted coup in Sudan in April 2023 was followed by further conflict which led to forced migration, including the arrival of over 280,000 refugees in Egypt. Natural disasters such as the Marrakesh-Safi earthquake in Morocco and the effects of Storm Daniel in Libya in September 2023 and the Gaza war may have also led to migration by people affected.

=== February ===
On 26 February, more than 70 people were killed in the 2023 Calabria migrant boat disaster off the southern coast of Italy.

=== March ===
On 1 March, two people were killed when a boat carrying 30 migrants capsized off the coast of Kos, Greece.

On 9 March, at least 14 people were killed and 54 rescued when their boat sank off the coast of Sfax region, Tunisia, en route to Europe.

On 12 March, at least 30 people were reported missing and 17 others were rescued after a boat that was sailing from Libya to Italy sank. All those involved in the incident were reportedly Bangladeshi migrants.

On 23 March, at least 5 people were killed and 33 others reported missing after their boat, which was sailing to Europe from Tunisia, sank.

On 24 March, at least 34 people were reported missing after their boat, which was travelling from Sfax to Italy, sank.

On 26 March, at least 29 people were killed when their boat sank off the coast of Tunisia. 5 of them were rescued.

=== April ===
On 12 April, a boat carrying migrants travelling from sub-Saharan Africa sank, resulting in the deaths of at least 25 people.

=== June ===
On 14 June, at least 500 people were killed when a boat carrying about 750 people from Tobruk, Libya capsized off the coast of Greece. 104 people were rescued, 30 hospitalized in Kalamata, and over 500 others remain missing, presumed dead.

=== July ===
On 9 July, a boat carrying migrants from Tunisia sank, killing 1 person and leaving 10 others missing. 11 people were rescued by the Tunisian coast guard.

=== December ===
On 16 December, a boat carrying about 86 migrants from Libya sank, drowning over 60 people including women and children.

== 2024 ==
10 April

- Two migrant boats from Tunisia sank in the Mediterranean Sea near Lampedusa. Nine people died, 22 survivors were rescued by Italian Coast Guard, and 15 were reported missing from one boat, all 45 people were reported missing from the other boat.

4 September

- A boat carrying 28 Syrian migrants traveling from Libya capsized and sank off the coast of Lampedusa, Pelagian Islands, Italy. Seven people were rescued, while 21 were reported missing.

18 December

- 20 people are killed and 5 others are rescued in a shipwreck carrying migrants sinking off the coast of Sfax, Tunisia.

20 December

- 8 people are killed and 18 others are rescued when a speedboat carrying migrants capsized off the coast of Rhodes, Greece.

== 2025 ==
On the Central Mediterranean Route, more than 1,300 people died in 2025, keeping it among the world's deadliest migration corridors.

In a paper published on the The New England Journal of Medicine in September 2026, a series of toxicological analyses from the poison control center of the Istituti Clinici Scientifici Maugeri in Pavia found that, between March 2024 and December 2025, a total of 82 migrant patients admitted to the port of Lampedusa had contracted severe methemoglobinemia due to dermal absorption of N-methylaniline from fuel-contaminated seawater while crossing the Central Mediterranean sea route by boat. Most of the patients were successfully treated with methylene blue, but 38 patients suffered hemolytic anemia as a complication, frequently needing blood transfusions, and two patients died from complications of the poisoning.

17 March

- A boat capsized off the southeastern coast of Cyprus while transporting an unknown number of migrants. The bodies of seven deceased people, and two survivors, were recovered by Cyprus search and rescue teams.

25 July

- A migrant boat capsized in the Mediterranean Sea, off the coast of Libya. Of the occupants, ten were rescued, fifteen were killed and others were reported missing.

13 August

- A boat carrying 97 migrants capsized in the Mediterranean Sea off the island of Lampedusa, Italy. Twenty people were confirmed dead, 60 were rescued and between twelve and seventeen were reported missing, with search efforts ongoing.

2 September

- Two migrant boats sank on the Los Muertos beach in Carboneras, Andalusia and Las Salinas beach in Cabo de Gata, Spain. Seven people were killed and 63 others were rescued.

7 September

- A high-speed boat carrying 34 migrants and a smuggler struck a Turkish Coast Guard vessel off the coast of Badavut, Ayvalık. Five people were killed, one person was seriously injured and another was reported missing.

24 October

- A rubber migrant boat heading for Europe took on water and sank shortly after departure off the coast of Bodrum, Turkey. Fourteen people were killed, two were rescued and two were reported missing.

3 November

- A migrant boat had an engine failure in high waves, causing it to capsize near the al-Buri Oil Field in Libya. Seven people were rescued and 42 others were presumed dead.

6 December

- A dinghy sailing from Tobruk, Libya, carrying migrants, partially sunk after an engine failure south of Crete, Greece. Seventeen people were killed, two were rescued and 15 were reported missing.

== 2026 ==
26 January

- It is reported that around 50 migrants aboard a vessel that departed from Tunisia died due to Storm Harry, leaving one confirmed survivor. According to the eyewitness, they were stranded in the water for about 24 hours, and that most migrants on board had died before rescue came. The wounded man was rescued after being found by a cargo ship off the coast of Tunisia, then was later brought to Malta for medical treatment. Maltese authorities confirmed the incident.

3 February

- A speedboat carrying migrants collided with a patrol boat of the Greek coast guard off the island of Chios, resulting in the death of 15 people. According to the Greek coast guard, the speedboat had its lights switched off and ignored signals to stop, with the collision taking place during the ensuing pursuit. 14 bodies of adults were recovered and 25 migrants were rescued, including 11 minors, with one injured woman later succumbing to her wounds. Two pregnant women had miscarriages. A search-and-rescue operation was launched, involving multiple coast guard boats, a helicopter and a private boat with civilian divers. The Greek coast guard was accused by the Refugee Support Aegean nonprofit of deploying an interception from the start, instead of a search-and-rescue operation.

28 March

- Twenty-two bodies were recovered from a vessel found adrift off the coast of Crete, Greece, according to the Greek coast guard. Twenty-six people were rescued by Frontex. Several survivors said some people were also thrown overboard into the sea on the orders of a human trafficker during the journey.

1 April

- Nineteen migrants were found dead and several others were in critical condition after a vessel that departed on March 28 from Zuara went adrift off the coast of Lampedusa. Fifty-eight of those aboard were rescued by authorities, including women and children. The IOM stated in its preliminary reports that the migrant boat was stranded for three days after its engine failed, and Reuters stated that all 19 fatalities—18 men and 1 woman—were attributed to hypothermia.
- An inflatable dinghy carrying Afghan migrants capsized off the coast of Bodrum killed 19 people, including a toddler. Twenty others were rescued, as rescue teams searched for one migrant who was unaccounted for. Initially, 18 bodies and 21 migrants were recovered by authorities, but one survivor later died at the hospital, which brought the total to 19 fatalities. According to the Turkish Coast Guard, the boat ignored multiple warnings, and attempted to flee at high speed in choppy waters until it capsized.

5 April

- More than 80 migrants went missing after a wooden boat carrying around 120 people overturned and capsized amid harsh weather in the Central Mediterranean. Two bodies were found as vessels of the Italian Coast Guard rescued 32 survivors from the wreck and later brought them to Lampedusa, according to the IOM. The migrant vessel departed from Tajoura, Libya. According to Mediterranea Saving Humans, the shipwreck occurred 14 nautical miles northwest of the ENI-NOC oil platforms in Bouri Field. Meanwhile, survivors told ANSA that most of the 80 fatalities were due to drowning before coast patrols arrived.

23 April

- At least 17 Somali migrants were killed after boat capsized in waters between Algeria and Spain, 100 kilometres (54 nmi) from Algiers.

30 April

- Seventeen migrants were killed and nine others were unaccounted after a vessel carrying 33 Sudanese migrants capsized off the coast of Tobruk, Libya. The vessel was en route to Greece until it eventually capsized, leaving seven survivors. IOM stated that most fatalities were due to starvation and thirst after being stranded for several days. Rescue operations carried out by the Libyan Coast Guard, Libyan Navy, and Libyan Red Crescent were initiated to find those missing, recover bodies, and rescue survivors.

== See also ==
Individual incidents

- Sinking of F174 (near Sicily in 1996)
- Tragedy of Otranto (between Italy and Albania in 1997)
- 2004 Karaburun, Albania, shipwreck
- 2006 Karaburun, Turkey, shipwreck
- 2007 Malta shipwreck
- 2007 Seferihisar, Turkey, shipwreck
- 2009 Libya shipwreck
- 2011 Lampedusa shipwreck
- 2012 Baradan Bay, Turkey, shipwreck
- 2012 Lesbos, Greece, shipwreck
- 2013 Lampedusa shipwreck
- 2014 Aegean Sea shipwreck
- 2014 Mediterranean ghost boat investigation (probable sinking)
- 2014 Libya shipwreck
- Death of Alan Kurdi (2 September 2015)
- 2014 Malta shipwreck
- 2016 Egypt shipwreck
- 2016 Libya shipwrecks
- 2018 Libya shipwrecks
- 2022 Tartus shipwreck
- 2023 Calabria shipwreck
- 2023 Tunisia shipwreck
- 2023 Pylos shipwreck
- 2023 Libya shipwrecks

Responses in the region

- Lampedusa immigrant reception center
- List of ships for the rescue of refugees
- Operation Poseidon (2006-2015)
- Operation Hermes (2011-2013)
- Operation Mare Nostrum (2013–2014)
- Operation Triton (2014–2018)
- Operation Themis (2018 onwards)
- Operation Sophia (2015–2020)
- Operation Irini (2020 onwards)

European migration issues

- Immigration to Europe
- African immigration to Europe
- European migrant crisis
- Immigration to Italy
- Immigration to Greece
- List of migrant vehicle incidents in Europe (on land)
