= September 2006 Karaburun, Turkey, migrant boat disaster =

Maritime incident in Turkey

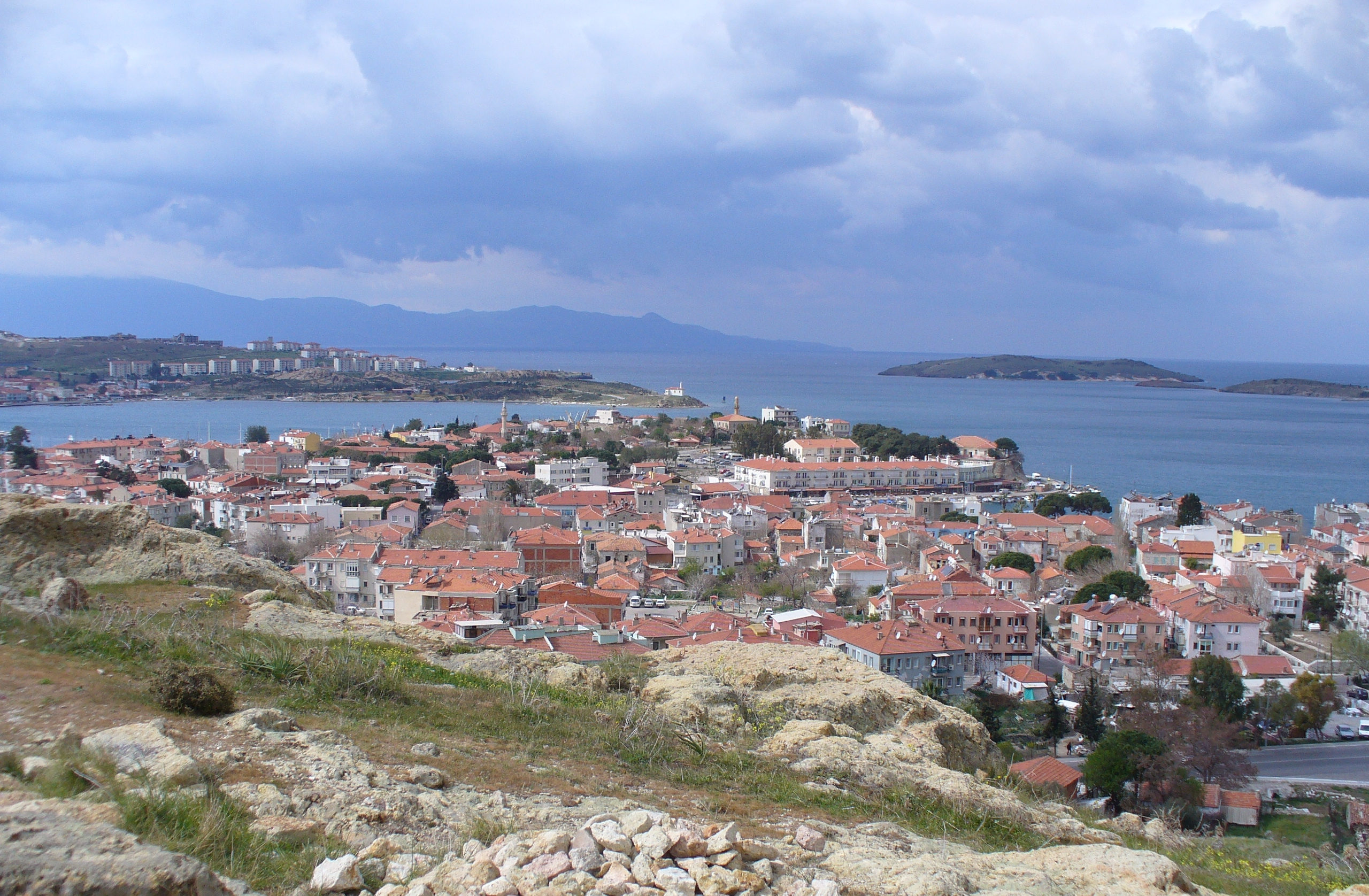
Karaburun Peninsula, in background.

September 2006 Karaburun, Turkey migrant boat disaster occurred on 26 September 2006 between the Greek island off Chios and the extreme western end of the Turkish coast near the port city of İzmir. It occurred in the coastal area of Küçükbahçe village, Karaburun district located in the western shore of Karaburun Peninsula, İzmir Province. The coastline of the northern part of Chios island extends opposite to Küçükbahçe village in the Anatolian mainland.

In the morning of 26 September 2006, a vessel of the Turkish Coast Guard picked up thirty-one illegal migrants from the sea, two of them women. The bodies of six drowned migrants were found on the same day and according to the accounts provided by these survivors three more had gone missing. Those dead by drowning included one Palestinian, one Algerian and one Iraqi national, as well as three Tunisians. The three missing were also Tunisians according to the survivors.

== See also ==
- December 2007 Seferihisar, Turkey migrant boat disaster
- 2007 Malta migrant shipwreck
