= F174 =

F174 may refer to:

- HMS Alacrity (F174), a Type 21 frigate of the Royal Navy
- Sinking of F174, the worst maritime disaster in the Mediterranean Sea since World War II
