= 2011 Lampedusa migrant shipwreck =

Capsizing of a migrant boat near the island of Lampedusa

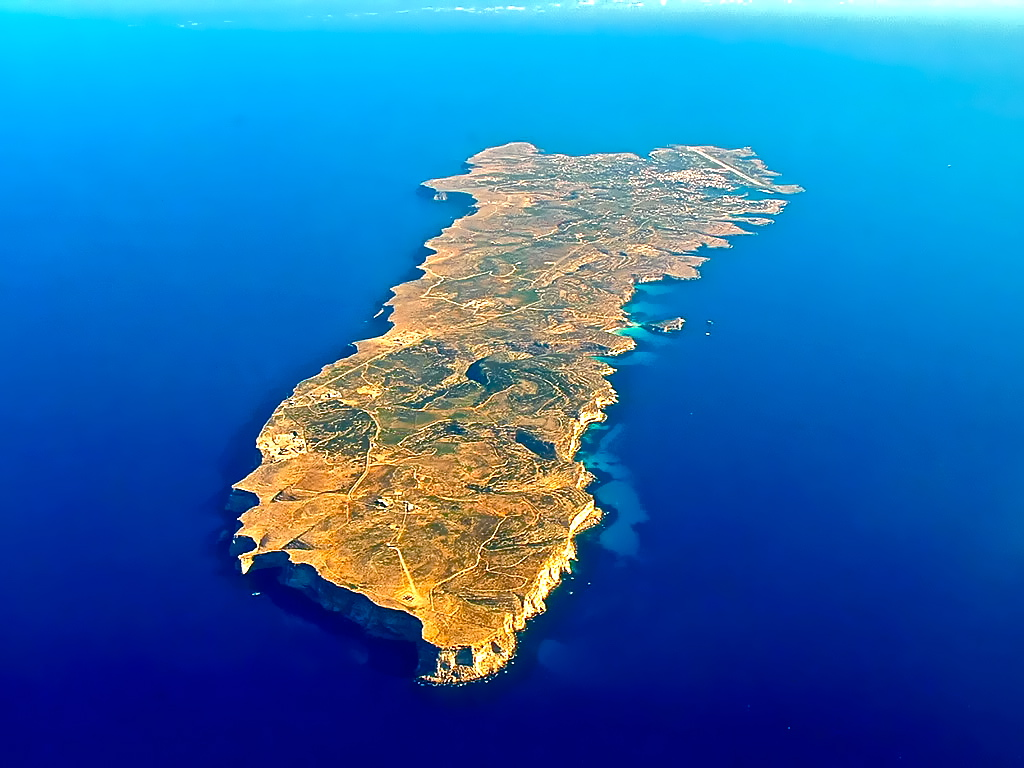
The island of Lampedusa.

On 6 April 2011, a boat carrying migrants from Libya to Italy sank 32 nautical miles (59 km; 37 mi) south of Lampedusa and 96 nautical miles (178 km; 110 mi) southwest of Malta. An emergency response involving the Italian Coast Guard resulted in the rescue of an initial 48 survivors and the retrieval of 20 bodies. A fishing boat picked up an additional three survivors. At least a further 130 people were not found after the shipwreck.

== Incident ==
The boat left from Zuwara in northwestern Libya on 4 April, amongst the first to leave the country after the unrest began in March. According to the International Organization for Migration, the capsized boat was believed to be carrying up to 300 North Africans and other migrants, mainly from Bangladesh, Chad, the Ivory Coast, Nigeria, Somalia and Sudan. Among them were five children and forty women, of whom only two survived. A distress signal was received by the Italian Coast Guard at around 4:00 am local time on the morning of 6 April, from approximately 64 kilometres (40 mi) south of Lampedusa. A Coast Guard spokesman indicated that the sinking was probably the result of high seas caused by strong winds and that the initial rescue effort was hampered by darkness and bad weather. Italian naval and air force assets were involved in locating the missing passengers, along with an aircraft from the Armed Forces of Malta. Five further people were located and rescued.

== Reaction ==
A United Nations High Commission for Refugees spokeswoman suggested that improved coordination was required in the identification of people migrating from Africa to Europe. Italian Prime Minister Silvio Berlusconi expressed "deep sorrow" at the loss of life.

== See also ==
- 2007 Malta migrant shipwreck
- 2009 Libya migrant shipwreck
- 2013 Lampedusa migrant shipwreck
