= 2009 Libya migrant shipwreck =

Capsizing of a migrant boat off the coast of Libya

Coordinates: 33.139851°N 12.713928°E

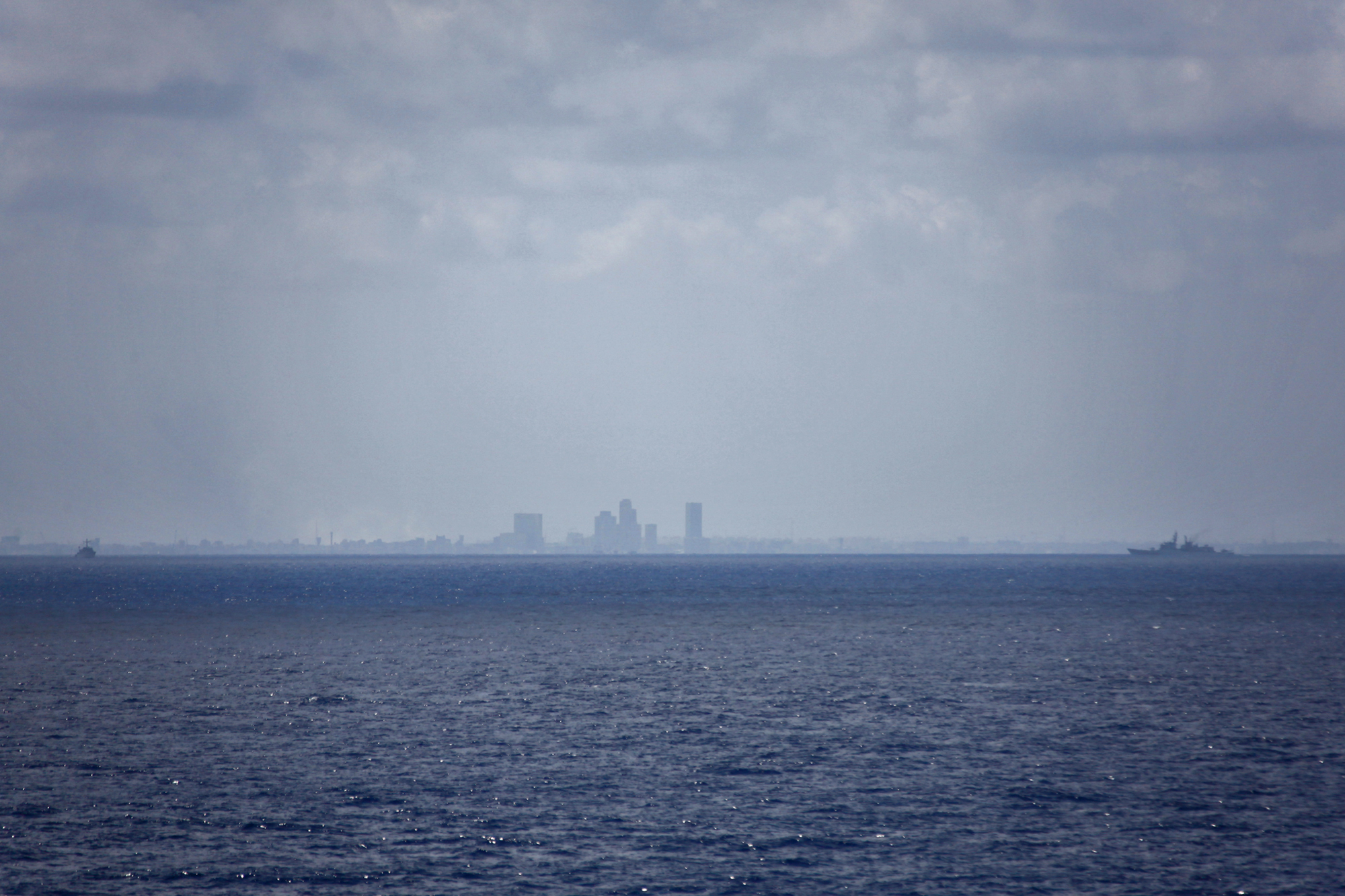
A view of Tripoli from the Mediterranean Sea.

On 27 March 2009, at least one boat carrying migrants from Libya to Italy capsized. The boat is believed to have been carrying 250 migrants from Egypt, Tunisia, Palestine and Nigeria. A rescue attempt involving the Italian and Libyan navies rescued 21 survivors from the boat and retrieved 21 bodies. A further 77 bodies subsequently washed up on the shores of Libya before rescue efforts were called off. Two other boats also went missing between Libya and Italy, carrying around 250 more people between them. A fourth boat, carrying 350 people, was rescued by an Italian merchant ship on 29 March in the same area of sea.

== Boat confirmed sunk ==
One vessel was confirmed by Libyan authorities to have capsized. It was a wooden fishing boat with a legal capacity of 50 persons and was attempting a crossing from Libya to Italy while carrying around 250 migrants. The boat set off from Sidi Bilal, near Tripoli, where survivors have said that it was already in a poor condition and possibly holed. The vessel is thought to have capsized 30 miles (48 km) off the Libyan coast on 27 March 2009 in high winds and seas. A search and rescue attempt was made on 29 March by the Libyan Navy, Italian Navy and local fishing boats, which recovered 21 people alive from the upturned boat and a further 23 bodies. At least 10 Egyptians and 10 Gambians were among the dead, along with Tunisians, Palestinians and Nigerians. Those rescued were returned to Tripoli and 17 were admitted to hospital for treatment. A further 77 bodies washed ashore on beaches to the west of Tripoli, including at Sebrata, on 31 March, the same day that search and rescue efforts were called off and the Libyan authorities made the news public. The remaining passengers were listed as missing, presumed dead.

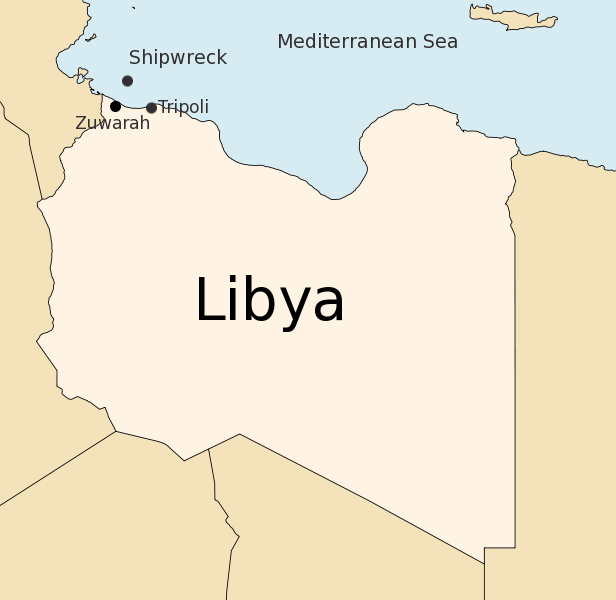
Location of the shipwreck

== Other boats ==
A second boat, similar to the one that capsized and carrying another 350 people, was rescued by an Italian merchant ship in the same area of sea on 29 March after being spotted by a nearby oil platform. Two more similar boats arrived in Italy in subsequent weeks, and a further two remained missing, having left Libya but never arrived in Italy. Coastguards from the two countries continued to search for the latter two boats. The capsized boat and the two that went missing are thought to have carried at least 500 people, of whom 200 were Nigerian.

The smuggling season normally runs from April to October but boats were sailing throughout the winter of 2008-9, which brings poor weather.

== Reaction ==
Apart from the search attempts, the Italian and Libyan navies agreed to begin joint patrols of the area between the two countries from May 2009 in an attempt to halt the people smuggling operations.

== See also ==
- 2007 Malta migrant shipwreck
- 2011 Lampedusa migrant shipwreck
- 2013 Lampedusa migrant shipwreck
