= 2022 Tartus migrant shipwreck =

September 2022 shipwreck off the Syrian coast

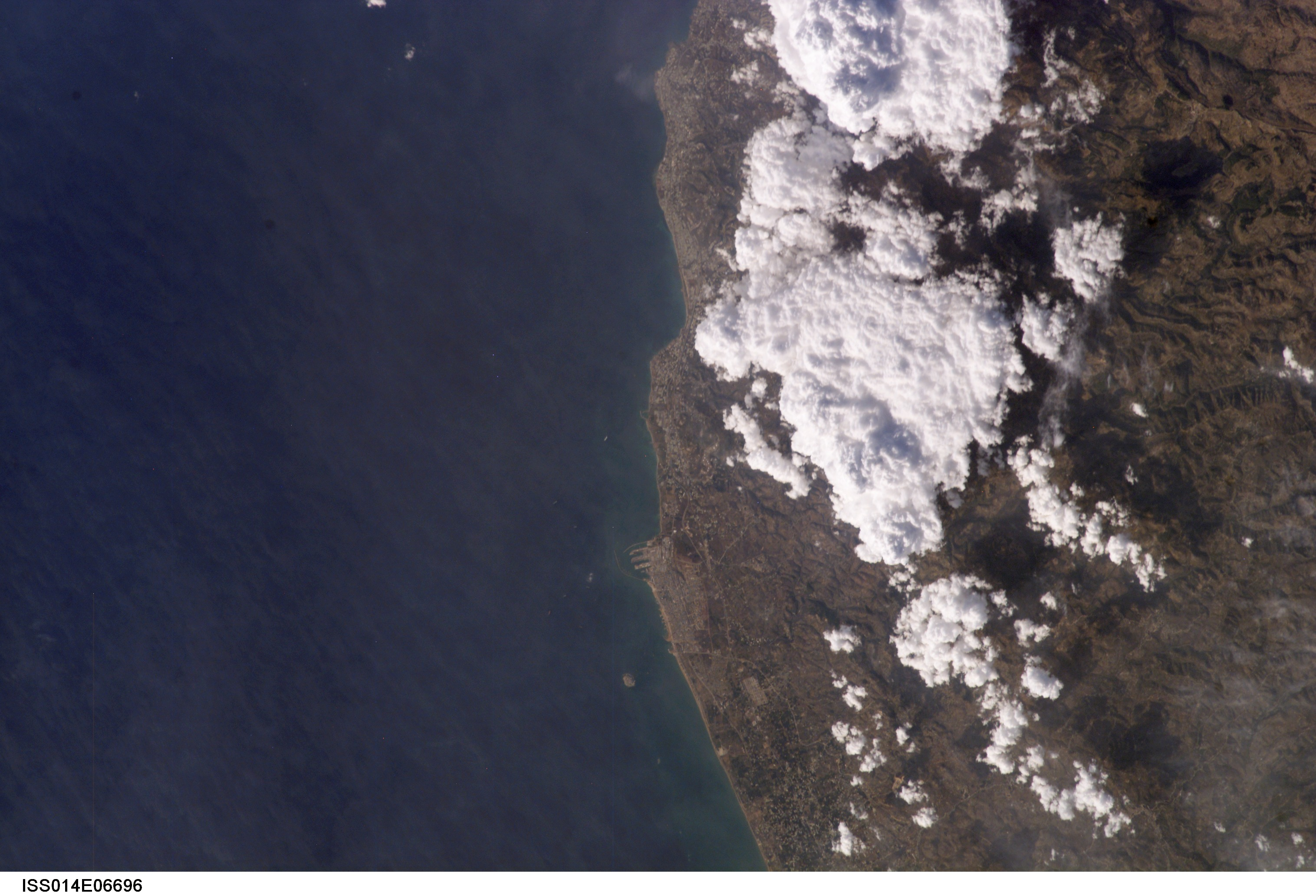
- Tartus coastland, Syria
- Date: 22 September 2022
- Location: Off the coast of Tartus, Syria
- Type: Shipwreck
- Target: Migrants from Syria, Lebanon and Palestine
- Deaths: About 150
- Injuries: 20

On 22 September, 2022, a ship carrying migrants escaping Lebanon sank off the coast of Tartus, Syria. The victims, intending to escape the Lebanese liquidity crisis, are estimated to number around 150 people, hailing from Syria, Lebanon, and Palestine. It is possibly one of the deadliest shipwrecks in the eastern Mediterranean in recent years.

== Incident ==
The ship departed on 20 September from Miniyeh, near Tripoli, on the northern coast of Lebanon, carrying around 170 people. Mostly Lebanese, Palestinians and Syrians trying to escape the poverty created by the Lebanese liquidity crisis. The intended destination of the ship was Italy. The boat sank off the coast of Tartus, about 50 km north of Tripoli, its starting point. According to eyewitnesses the boat was carrying many more people than it was supposed to hold; bad weather and large waves also contributed to the disaster. Survivors had to swim for hours to reach rescue vessels.

The Syrian Ministry of Transport said that most of the victims and survivors were found near Arwad island. The Syrian coastguard and rescue workers, including a Russian search party, was able to save 21 people, 30 people remain missing, 20 injured victims as well as bodies were taken to Al-Basel Hospital in Tartus. Rescue operations were halted overnight due to the weather conditions, including high waves. UNICEF reported that at least 10 children were among the victims; later the number was stated as 24. Out of 34 women only 1 survived. According to Lebanon’s transport minister, Ali Hamie, the survivors included 12 Syrians, 5 Lebanese and 3 Palestinians.

UNHCR provided material support to survivors in Tarsus. In the following days the Syrian Red Crescent transported the bodies of Lebanese and Palestinian victims to the Arida border crossing where they were received by the Lebanese Red Cross. The boat was carrying 39 Palestinians, 35 from Nahr al-Bared refugee camp and 4 from Shatila refugee camp in Lebanon. The majority of the victims were Syrians from Idlib, Aleppo and Latakia.

The Lebanese Army arrested an individual believed to be related to the smuggling. Funerals for the deceased were held in Tripoli.

== Background ==
The United Nations High Commissioner for Refugees said the number of migrants attempting the dangerous journey from Lebanon to Europe more than doubled in 2022 for the second year in a row, while the primary destination for the smuggler boats had shifted from Cyprus to Italy. The main reason behind the increase is the worsening Lebanese economic crisis and a lack of jobs. The majority of people fleeing from Lebanon are Syrian refugees while Lebanese and Palestinian refugees in Lebanon are in smaller numbers. Additionally UNICEF reported that "years of political instability and economic crisis in Lebanon have pushed many children and families into poverty". The economic situation in the north of Lebanon is more acute with common water and power cuts.

== Reactions ==
- In a joint statement International Organization for Migration, UNHCR, and UNRWA have "called on coastal states to increase efforts to build their capacity to provide search and rescue services and to work to ensure predictability in identifying safe places of disembarkation. However, it is even more critical that action be taken to address the root causes of these movements and for the international community, in line with the principle of responsibility-sharing, to strengthen access to safer, alternative pathways to stop people resorting to dangerous journeys. Much more humanitarian and development support must also go to those displaced and host communities throughout the region to help stem their suffering and improve their living conditions and opportunities. Failing this, refugees, asylum-seekers, migrants, and internally displaced people will continue to take dangerous journeys in search of safety, protection, and a better life."
- Filippo Grandi, UNHCR: “This is yet another heart-wrenching tragedy and we extend our deepest condolences to all those impacted. We call for full solidarity from the international community to help improve the conditions of forcibly displaced people and host communities in the Middle East, particularly in countries neighboring Syria. Too many people are being pushed to the brink.”
- António Vitorino, IOM Director General: “People looking for safety should not be compelled to take such perilous and often deadly migration journeys. We must work together to increase safe and legal pathways to regular migration to help reduce loss of life and protect vulnerable people on the move."
- Philippe Lazzarini, UNRWA Commissioner-General: “This is just tragic. No one gets on these death boats lightly. People are taking this perilous decisions, risking their lives in search of dignity. We must do more to offer a better future and address a sense of hopelessness in Lebanon and across the region, including among Palestine refugees.”
- Adele Khodr, UNICEF Regional Director for the Middle East and North Africa: “UNICEF is deeply saddened by reports that several children are among those who lost their lives when a boat sank off the coast of Tartus, Syria last night, claiming dozens of lives, including children. Our thoughts and condolences go to their families whose lives have been devastated by this tragedy."

== See also ==
- List of migrant vessel incidents on the Mediterranean Sea
