= 2013 Lampedusa migrant shipwreck =

Fatal maritime incident near Italy

- 2013 Lampedusa migrant shipwreck (Mediterranean)
- Date: 3, 11 October 2013
- Location: Lampedusa, Italy; 35°30′N 12°36′E
- Cause: Vessels capsized
- Participants: Over 500
- Deaths: (over 360 estimated; 359 confirmed)

On 3 October 2013, a boat carrying migrants from Libya to Italy sank off the Italian island of Lampedusa. It was reported that the boat had sailed from Misrata, Libya, but that many of the migrants were originally from Eritrea, Somalia and Ghana. An emergency response involving the Italian Coast Guard resulted in the rescue of 155 survivors. On 12 October it was reported that the confirmed death toll after searching the boat was 359, but that further bodies were still missing; a figure of "more than 360" deaths was later reported.

A second shipwreck occurred 120 kilometres (75 mi) from Lampedusa on 11 October, within the Maltese search and rescue zone, but closer to Lampedusa. The boat was reportedly carrying migrants from Syria, and at least 34 individuals were later confirmed dead.

== 3 October incident ==
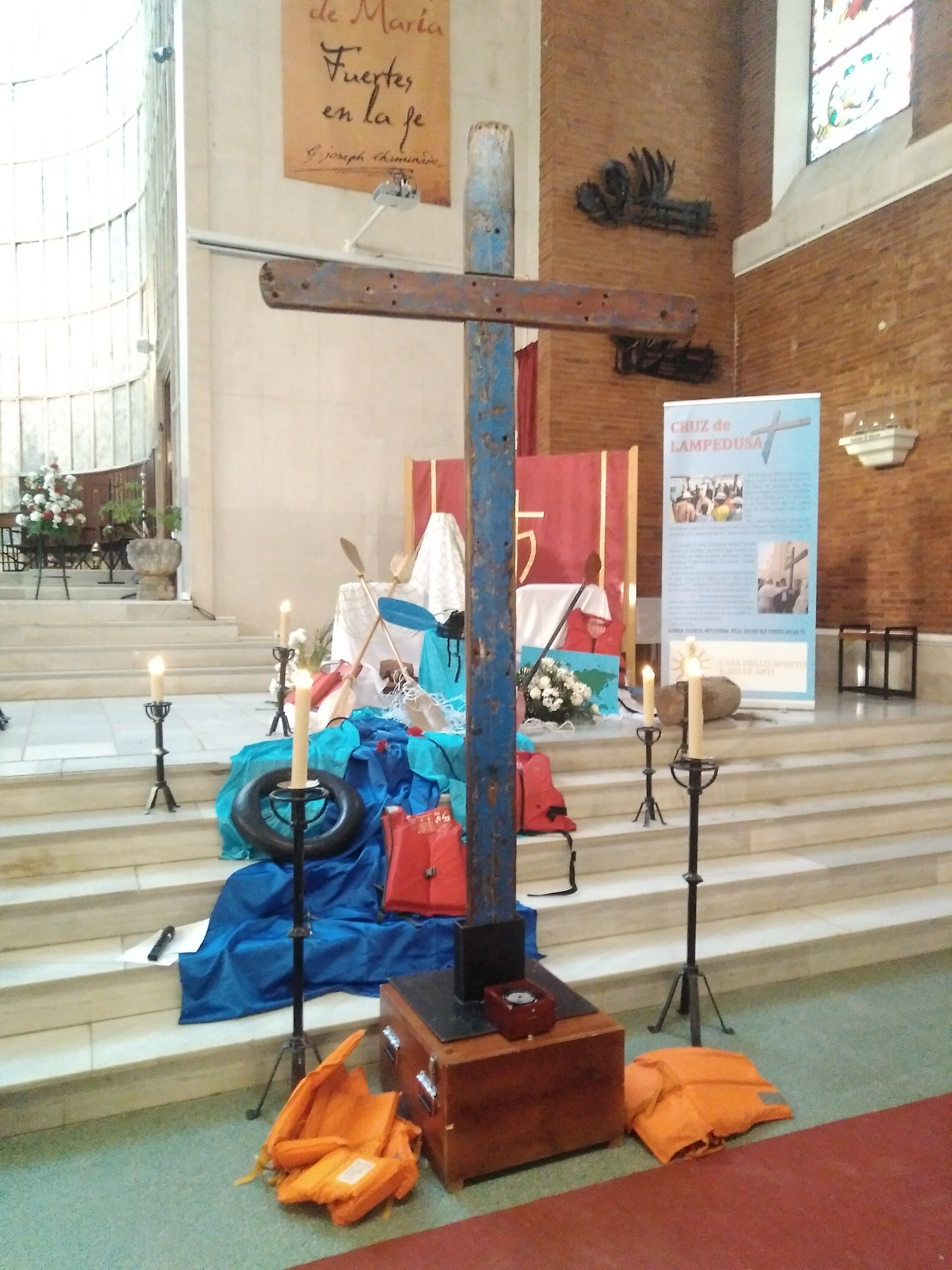
Cross made with wood of broken immigration boats in Lampedusa

It was initially reported that over five hundred people were on board the 20-metre-long (66 ft) fishing boat when it began to have engine trouble less than a quarter-mile from Lampedusa, causing the ship to begin sinking. In an attempt to contact nearby boats, a blanket on the ship was set on fire. This fire ignited some gasoline and began to engulf the boat before it sank. To avoid the flames, many people threw themselves into the water or moved away from the fire to the same part of the ship, which then capsized. At least 350 people were initially declared missing.

On 7 October, it was reported that 194 bodies had been recovered, and that the final death toll could rise to between 325 and 363 individuals. A total of 155 people had been rescued. A further 108 bodies were reported retrieved by 9 October, after access was gained to the inside of the boat's hull, resting some 47 metres (154 ft) beneath the surface of the water. On 11 October, it was reported that all bodies had been recovered from the boat, and the confirmed death toll had reached 339. About 50 were believed to be still missing, and searches for further bodies in the area would continue using aircraft and robotic devices. A further 20 bodies had been found by 12 October, bringing the total to 359. The total number of dead was later reported as "more than 360".

On 8 November, it was reported that the migrants had each paid at least $3,000 (£1,866) to the Libyan, Somali and Sudanese trafficking group before making the sea crossing from Libya. Women who were unable to pay were said to have been raped, and men who rebelled were tied up and tortured. The alleged captain of the boat, a 35-year-old Tunisian named as Khaled Bensalam, who was reported to have been deported from Italy in April 2013, was arrested under suspicion of being responsible for the sinking. It was reported that he could be charged with manslaughter. On 8 November, a 34-year-old Somali national, Mouhamud Elmi Muhidin, and a Palestinian man, Attour Abdalmenem, were also arrested under suspicion of having been among the traffickers that organized the voyage. Police indicated that Muhidin was facing a series of charges, including people trafficking, kidnapping, sexual assault, and criminal association with the aim of abetting illicit immigration. The two men were detained by the Italian police after a number of the shipwreck survivors spotted and began attacking them.

== Reaction ==
Pope Francis of the Roman Catholic Church tweeted "pray [to] God for the victims of the shipwreck off Lampedusa," while Italian Prime Minister Enrico Letta tweeted that it was "an immense tragedy". António Guterres, the United Nations High Commissioner for Refugees, commended the Italian Coast Guard for their quick reaction to the disaster. The Italian Government launched Operation Mare Nostrum in order to avoid new tragedies.

Italian Deputy Prime Minister Angelino Alfano stated that the incident highlighted the need for European assistance to handle the continuing influx of refugees, declaring the shipwreck "a European tragedy, not just an Italian one[...] The toll is unfortunately a tragic one". A national day of mourning was also announced in Italy.

In response to the deaths, Cecilia Malmström, European Commissioner for Home Affairs, called for the European Union to increase their Mediterranean-wide search and rescue patrols to intercept migrant boats, through the Frontex border agency. She said: "Let's make sure that what happened in Lampedusa will be a wakeup call to increase solidarity and mutual support and to prevent similar tragedies in the future." José Manuel Barroso, President of the European Commission, and Italian Prime Minister Letta visited Lampedusa on 9 October. Letta announced that a state funeral would be held for the migrants who died, and Barroso said that 30 million euros would be used to help refugees in Italy.

== Shipwreck of 11 October ==
11 October shipwreck
- Date: 11 October 2013
- Location: Off Malta Mediterranean
- Cause: Vessel capsized
- Participants: 200
- Outcome: Vessel sank, 147 rescued
- Deaths: 34 confirmed

A second shipwreck occurred on 11 October, 120 kilometres (75 mi) from Lampedusa within the territorial waters of Malta. Reports the following day stated that 34 were confirmed dead; initial unconfirmed reports of at least 50 bodies appeared to be exaggerated. The boat was carrying over 200 migrants, reportedly from Syria and Palestine, and capsized when people on board moved to one side of the vessel as they tried to get the attention of a passing aircraft. The rescue operation was coordinated by the Maltese authorities, with the assistance of some of the Italian vessels involved after 3 October shipwreck at Lampedusa. Some 147 survivors were taken to Malta, and a further 56 were taken to Italy. According to some of the Syrian migrants, the boat was fired upon by Libyan militiamen during a trafficking gang dispute.

After the second shipwreck, the Prime Minister of Malta, Joseph Muscat, complained of a lack of action from other European countries on the problem of migration across the sea, and said: "As things stand we are building a cemetery within our Mediterranean Sea." United Nations Secretary-General Ban Ki-moon called on the international community as a whole "to take action to prevent such tragedies in the future, including measures that address their root causes and that places the vulnerability and human rights of migrants at the centre of the response."

On 8 November, Italian police arrested a 47-year-old Palestinian man, Attour Abdalmenem, for having allegedly been among the traffickers that organized the voyage.

Two Italian officers were accused of multiple manslaughter by delaying the rescue of the boat. Their trial commenced in July 2019, and though found guilty, they were not convicted as the trial was brought beyond the limitations period by the COVID-19 pandemic.

== See also ==
- Lampedusa immigrant reception center
- Ghost boat investigation
- 2009 Libya migrant shipwreck
- 2011 Lampedusa migrant shipwreck
- 2014 Libya migrant shipwreck
- 2023 Pylos migrant boat disaster
