= Lampedusa immigrant reception center =

Immigrant detention center in Italy

Coordinates: 35.5000°N 12.6000°E

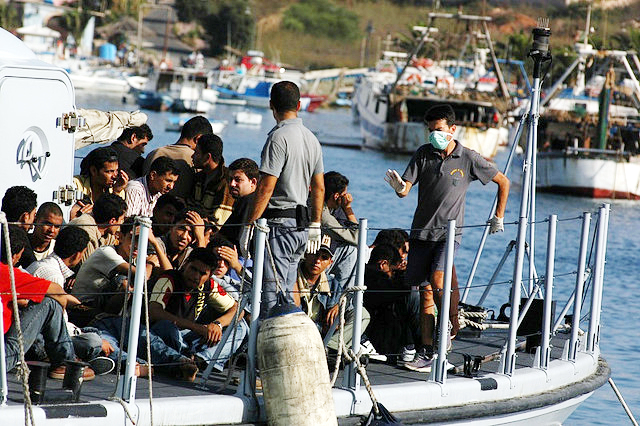
Migrants arriving on the Island of Lampedusa in August 2007

The Lampedusa immigrant reception center, officially Reception Center (CDA) of Lampedusa, has been operating since 1998, when the Italian island of Lampedusa became a primary European entry point for immigrants from Africa. It is one of a number of centri di accoglienza (CDA) maintained by the Italian government. The reception center's capacity of 801 people has been greatly exceeded by numerous people arriving on boats from various parts of Africa.

== History ==
Since the early 2000s, with the onset of the ever increasing mass migration to Europe, Lampedusa has become a prime transit point for irregular migrants from Africa, the Middle East and Asia wanting to enter Europe. In 2004, the Libyan and Italian governments reached a secret agreement that obliged Libya to accept those deported from Italian territories. This resulted in the mass return of many people from Lampedusa to Libya between 2004 and 2005. The European Parliament adopted a resolution on 14 April 2005 calling on the Italian authorities "to refrain from collective expulsions of asylum seekers and 'irregular migrants' to Libya".

By 2006, many people were paying people smugglers in Libya to help get them to Lampedusa by boat. On arrival, most were then transferred by the Italian government to reception centres in mainland Italy. Many were then released because their deportation orders were not enforced.

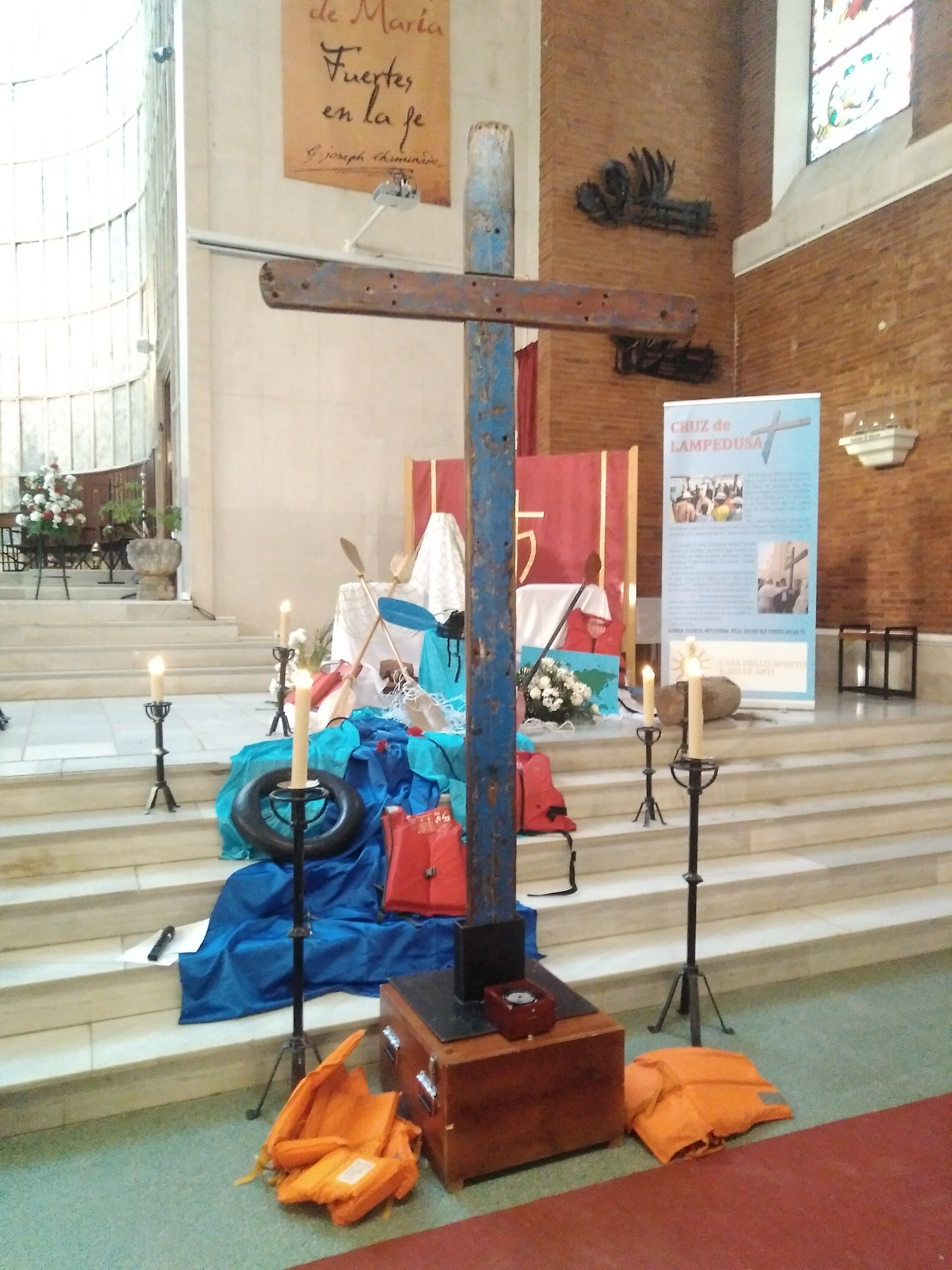
Cross made with wood of broken immigration boats in Lampedusa

In 2009, the overcrowded conditions at the island's temporary immigrant reception centre came under criticism by the United Nations High Commissioner for Refugees (UNHCR). The unit, which was originally built for a maximum capacity of 850 people, was reported to be housing nearly 2,000 boat people. Most of them were from Ghana, Mali and Nigeria and were working illegally as seasonal farm workers. A significant number of people were sleeping outdoors under plastic sheeting. A fire started during an inmate riot destroyed a large portion of the holding facility on 19 February 2009.

In 2011, the rebellions in Tunisia and Libya resulted in an increase in the rate of people moving to Lampedusa. By May 2011, more than 35,000 migrants had arrived on the island from Tunisia and Libya. By the end of August, 48,000 had arrived. Most were young males in their 20s and 30s. The situation has caused division within the EU, the French government regarding most of the arrivals as economic migrants rather than refugees in fear of persecution. The Libyan ambassador to Italy, who had defected earlier that year to the National Transitional Council, stated that Gaddafi controlled illegal migration "in person" to meet his goals: "he wanted to turn Lampedusa black with Africans".

In October 2013, the center accommodated the survivors of the shipwreck of a boat carrying migrants from Eritrea, Somalia and elsewhere, which capsized offshore, resulting in least 300 deaths. The press referred to that incident as the "Lampedusa boat disaster".

In 2014, 170,100 migrants arrived in Italy by sea, a 296% increase compared to 2013. 141,484 of the travellers ferried over from Libya. Most of the migrants had come from Syria, Eritrea and various countries in West Africa.

== See also ==
- Refugees of the 2011 Libyan Civil War
- Terraferma (film)
- April 2015 Mediterranean Sea migrant shipwrecks
- Fire at Sea
- Pietro Bartolo
