= Sinking of F174 =

1996 maritime disaster in the Mediterranean Sea

Coordinates: 36°25′31″N 14°54′34″E

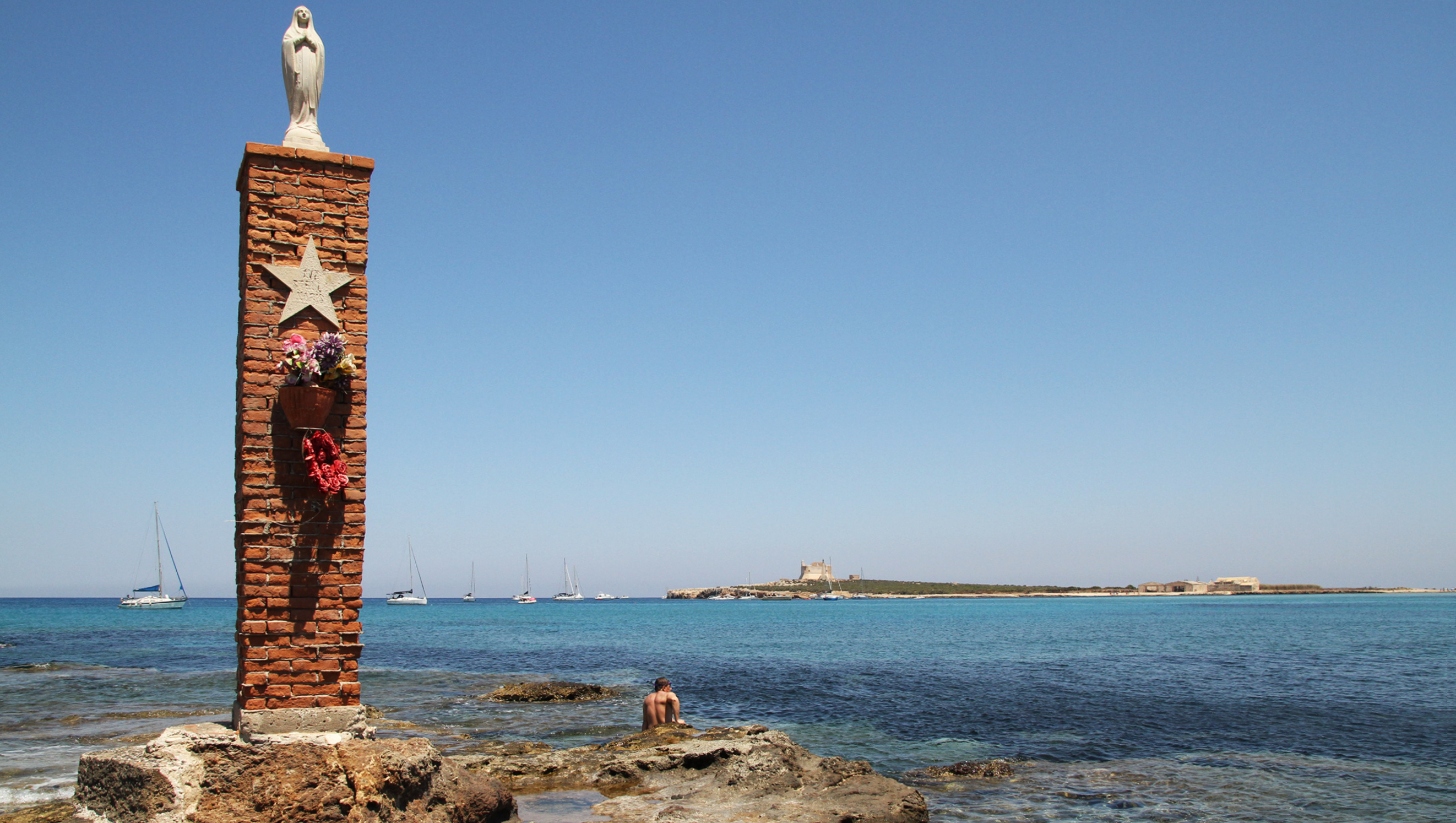
Memorial at Capo Passero, 2014

The sinking of the ship F174 took place on the night of December 25–26, 1996, off the coast of Sicily, in the Mediterranean Sea. An old, severely overloaded wooden ship transporting illegal immigrants from India, Sri Lanka and Pakistan to Italy sank 19 nautical miles (22 mi; 35 km) from Portopalo di Capo Passero in Sicily (Italy), under questionable circumstances, and came to rest under 108 metres (354 ft) of water. The number of deaths remains unknown, but at least 283 men, women and children perished.

This event was, at the time, the worst maritime disaster in the Mediterranean Sea since World War II. It has since been surpassed by several other migrant shipwrecks. The disaster is known in Italy as the Strage di Natale (Christmas massacre) or Portopalo massacre.

The fishermen of Portopalo became aware of the disaster when they began to recover human remains and other evidence in their nets. However, they and practically all of the other residents of Portopalo failed to report it to the authorities, fearing that government action would interfere with their livelihood. La Repubblica reporter Giovanni Maria Bellu finally broke the story, leading to much soul searching in Italy over the indifference to the fate of illegal immigrants.

== The tragedy ==
=== Rendezvous in Alexandria ===
Illegal migrants traveled along many different routes, all of them controlled by human traffickers from Turkey and Kurdistan, from the Indo-Pakistani region and assembled in Cairo and Alexandria, hoping to reach the coast of Italy. They were supposed to board a large fishing vessel, the Friendship, but the payload was not enough for the shipowner to risk the voyage to the Italian coast. After 12 days of waiting for a new group of migrants, they were moved to a new ship, a Maltese freighter named the Iohan El Hallal (or Yohan according to some sources), flying a Honduran flag. Commanded by Lebanese Captain Youssef El-Hallal, the Iohan El Hallal was barely big enough to accommodate 470 passengers.

=== Ship swap ===
On December 24 (or possibly 25), the ship sailed for international waters, where the passengers were secretly unloaded onto another boat, codenamed F174 (actual name unknown). Some passengers complained about the bad condition of the vessel, but were forced to board it by the captain, armed and purportedly drunk.

F174 was a vessel 18 metres (59 ft) long, 4 metres (13 ft) wide, painted white and blue, designed for short fishing trips and furnished with freezers in the hold. At best, it could hold 80 passengers and crew, and was usually used as a shuttle to bring food and water from the docks to the Iohan. The hold was accessible only through a small hatch. It was in terrible shape and missing any safety features. Its wooden hull was worn out and the ship was barely staying afloat in the stormy sea. Survivors who later testified in a Greek trial called it a "floating coffin". After the fishing vessel showed signs of instability due to the extreme load, about a hundred migrants were sent back to the Iohan, leaving over 300 (317 according to some survivors) to begin the final leg of their trip.

It is unclear why the Iohan was not used instead of the less seaworthy F174, especially since a storm was highly likely and strong winds had been reported. The Italian coasts were normally patrolled by military ships, but the bigger ship had been used on smuggling runs, and would later do so again.

=== The sinking ===
While moving people between ships, F174 was struck in the bow by the Iohan. The damage was underestimated and the transfer continued, but part of the bow planking gave way and water began to enter the ship. When the emergency became clear, Eftychios Zervoudakis, the Greek commander and owner of F174, asked the Iohan for help. A few minutes later, the bigger ship was on the way to the rescue.

It is unclear if F174 broke up due to a small gale or if, as some survivors claimed later, the ship went down as a result of a collision with the Iohan when the latter came to pick up Zervoudakis, who had jumped into the sea well before the final moments of his ship. In any case, the sinking took only a matter of minutes.

Only 30 people could be saved by the Iohan's lifeboats. The exit through the small hatch impaired those fleeing from the sinking ship, and the secondary hatches were blocked by the people standing on the deck, too scared to jump in the freezing water or waiting a rope from the mother ship. The Lebanese captain, drunk and aggressive, purportedly forbade the passengers to help the drowning people. At least 283 people sank with the ship.

=== The Iohan afterwards ===
The Iohan sailed for Greece with about 170 survivors. There, the captain unloaded the passengers and managed to have them segregated in a clandestine jail inside an abandoned farmhouse. Some migrants escaped and alerted the local police. They reported the sinking, but were not believed and were sent to a real jail.

The Iohan continued bringing illegal migrants to Italy, until it was spotted and impounded while leaving Calabria on February 28. Italian officers investigated the ship superficially, but got no clue of the tragedy.

== Hiding and first reports ==
=== Fishermen ===
From January 2, Portopalo fishermen began to find corpses, body parts and personal belongings in their nets, but did not alert the local police. Notifying the Capitaneria di Porto could have meant being questioned or, worse, having ships and equipment impounded for investigations without any financial compensation at a time where the fishing season was at its peak.

Many fishermen just threw the bodies back into the sea, and became a well-kept secret of the fishing community. Those who brought back some of the corpses were threatened with bureaucratic obstruction and lost ten days of work before having their ships restored to them. The widespread feeling was that the officers were trying to avoid problems and responded with hostility and retaliation to any initiative to act in the matter.

=== Salvatore Lupo ===
In 2001, local fisherman Salvatore "Salvo" Lupo, unaware of the tragedy, went fishing in an unusual spot. His nets caught something underwater and were damaged. He recovered them and found clothes with coins in the pockets and the ID card of a 17-year-old Tamil named Ampalagan Ganeshu from Chawchsceri. Lupo alerted the Sea Authority about what he had found and about the likely presence of a wreck in the spot where F174 sank. The officers did not believe him. Through a friend living in Rome, Lupo contacted journalist Giovanni Maria Bellu, who was investigating rumors about the sinking, and gave him the coordinates.

Lupo's story met with mixed public response; he was supported by some of his fellow townsfolk, but met with hostility from many others, who accused him of having betrayed his town, slandered its name, and potentially ruined the fishing and tourist season. After the story broke, he embarked on a five-month fishing cruise trip and ultimately had to quit fishing due to threats to him and his ship.

While young people, townsfolk and many fishermen came to terms with the tragedy in the following years, city officers and politicians claimed that this event was a dark spot on city's reputation and opposed many initiatives to honor the memory of the deceased. When Bellu's book I Fantasmi di Portopalo (Ghosts of Portopalo) was published, it was harshly criticized by the city's mayor, Fernando Cammisuli. Questioned, he stated that he had read only "a few pages" of the book. Remembrance ceremonies in the following years were largely unattended by city officers, and only about 400 of the 3000 residents of Portopalo showed up.

== Inquiry ==
The first rumors about the sinking were quickly dismissed as exaggerations and falsehoods. The official stance of the Italian government was firm disbelief in the story, which was repeatedly described as an "alleged sinking".

=== Filming the wreckage ===
In 2001, Bellu managed to send a remotely operated underwater vehicle (ROV) to the seabed to film the wreck and the skeletons of the victims. The whole investigation up to that point had been done at his expense, since no newspaper thought the story to be of public interest. The ROV mission was sponsored by the newspaper la Repubblica and the magazine L'espresso.

The ROV filmed the damaged hull, showing consistent damage to the bow and right side of the ship. The first signs of the wreck came in the form of a sneaker shoe, followed by denim trousers containing a human femur. Skeletons were found still in the hold, but many of the skulls had detached and fallen to the seabed.

The Siracusa Prosecutor's Office had begun an official inquiry after the first articles by Bello, but after the wreck was found, was forced to abandon any prosecution since the ship was in international waters, not under Italian jurisdiction.

=== The territorial competency issue ===
Prosecutors chose to apply an unusual procedure, which allowed them to prosecute crimes committed outside national territory if they are of particular relevance. F174's captain and a Pakistani smuggler were accused of "aggravated multiple voluntary homicide", while the charges against any other crew member of both F174 and the Iohan were dropped.

The Greek captain and owner of F174, Eftychios Zebourdakis, fled to France and could not be prosecuted due to France's refusal to extradite him. The Pakistani, Tourab Ahmed Sheik, who was living in Malta, was discharged from the first degree offence, but was later sentenced to 30 years for the second degree crime in 2008, along with the captain (in absentia). The Iohan's captain, the Lebanese El Hallal, could not be prosecuted due to the international waters clause. From the inquiry, it emerged that both he and Zebourdakis were part of a wider cartel of human traffickers reaching from Karachi to Colombo and Alexandria.

Zervoudakis came under scrutiny by Greek prosecutors, who held a separate trial. In 1999, he was arrested and jailed in Greece while trying to smuggle another load of immigrants.

=== Bureaucratic obstacles to the hearing ===
During the proceedings, relatives of the victims from India, Sri Lanka and Pakistan asked to be heard, but Italian embassy denied them visas. This caused a minor public outcry by civil right activists.

Relatives living in Italy said they risked being jailed (due to the new immigration law) and could not testify either. Zabihullah Bacha, father of the deceased Syed Habib, lived in Italy up until 1995, when he returned to Pakistan to assist his mother. After the tragedy, he asked to return to Italy, but his permit was delayed. He came back as an illegal alien, waiting for an official permit, to testify at the proceedings. He was arrested and risked imprisonment, so he decided to go back to Pakistan.

Balwant Singh Khera, a spiritual leader of the Pakistani community, staged a demonstration along with four fellow countryman in the Via della Conciliazione in Rome in 1998. He made speeches explaining to pilgrims walking to the Vatican the tragic story of the sunken ship, but was held and threatened by the police. He later compiled a dossier about immigration channels, with help from some survivors in India, and was asked to present his findings to the court. Unfortunately, Khera's permit expired; he had to go back to India and was denied an entry visa to Italy.

=== The "deliberate sinking" theory ===
Shahab Ahmad, one of the few survivors, stated that the Iohan struck the F174 on purpose. After trying to have their voices heard by the prosecutors, some of the survivors managed to get in touch with attorney Simonetta Crisci. They were recalled to Italy and allowed to give testimony.

Shahab brought an old notepad, on which, a few days after the tragedy had occurred, he had written down the names of the drowned he knew. He told how he spent $7000 to travel from Karachi to Damasco and Latakia, where he boarded a ship called Alex, being later reshipped to the Ena, the Friendship, and finally the Iohan. He stated he was to pay another $7000 after disembarking in Italy.

During the four-month trip, passengers were kept segregated, with barely enough water and food to survive. No personal hygiene, razors or haircuts were allowed. That, suggested Shahab, could mean that they were never meant to complete their trip.

According to what Shahab told the prosecutors, when the Iohan hit the F174, the small ship circled for more than an hour before sinking. That kept it from reaching shallower waters, if not the coastline. Passengers alerted the captain, Eftychios Zervoudakis, that the ship was taking water, but all he did was call the Iohan via cellphone and, after five minutes, jump into the cold water to be picked up by the larger ship. Shahab stated that the Iohan's captain, Youssef El Hallal, prohibited his passengers from throwing ropes to the drowning people. A young Indian was thrown back into the sea at his order.

While the testimony was deemed interesting, the deliberate sinking was not proved.

== Public response ==
=== Attempts to publicize the disaster ===
The tragedy remained unknown to the general public for five years, until Bellu made available the photographs of the wreck taken by the ROV and he published his book Ghosts of Portopalo. Coincidentally, the day before the tragedy, migrants had staged a demonstration in Piazza Colonna in Rome and a hunger strike to assert their "right to exist".

In those five years, friends and relatives of the victims had tried to publicize their cause. Relatives of the Pakistani victims succeeded in joining forces thanks to Mr. Zabiullah, father of one of the deceased, and worked together to trace the whole chain of people and organizations managing the human traffic from Pakistan, to Greece and Italy, led by Turkish criminals, Greek shipowners, Kurd warlords and Italian Mafia. This report, published in Italy by Narcomafie, helped in the proceedings against the crew of the recently impounded Iohan.

The finding of a sunken body near Gela sparked interest by other journalists and by the Indian and Pakistani embassies. The Sri Lankan embassy preferred not to get involved, since their dead were mostly Tamils, a persecuted minority in that country. Two of the dead were relatives of Shabir Khan, the leader of the Italian Pakistani community, and had applied for residence permits.

=== Government's stance on immigration ===
Requests by local citizens, European civil rights associations and Portuguese government to Silvio Berlusconi's administration to recover the wreckage and corpses went unheard. The same happened to any call for a broader inquiry about the human traffic in the Mediterranean and the lack of action by local officers who got a hint of the tragedy.

Many civil rights activist and civil associations spoke out against the new immigration law that criminalized illegal aliens, which implied that fishermen helping a sinking immigrant boat in order to save lives could be prosecuted for helping clandestine immigration (as happened in 2004 in the case of the ship Cap Anamour, which was impounded for saving from the sea 39 Darfur immigrants). The Portopalo tragedy was cited as an example of bad behavior caused by unfair immigration laws.

=== Media representations ===
Book: Giovanni Maria Bellu (2006-05-01). I fantasmi di Portopalo [The ghosts of Portopalo]. Mondadori. ISBN 978-8804553588.

On September 30, 2007, the investigative journalism TV show Blu Notte aired an episode about the sinking.

A few theater plays have been written about the tragedy, the most famous being La Nave Fantasma (Ghost Ship), with dramatic actor and comedian Bebo Storti. Bellu, Storti and Renato Sarti are the play's authors.
