= December 2012 Lesbos, Greece, migrant boat disaster =

Sinking of a migrant boat in the Aegean Sea

December 2012 Lesbos, Greece migrant boat disaster
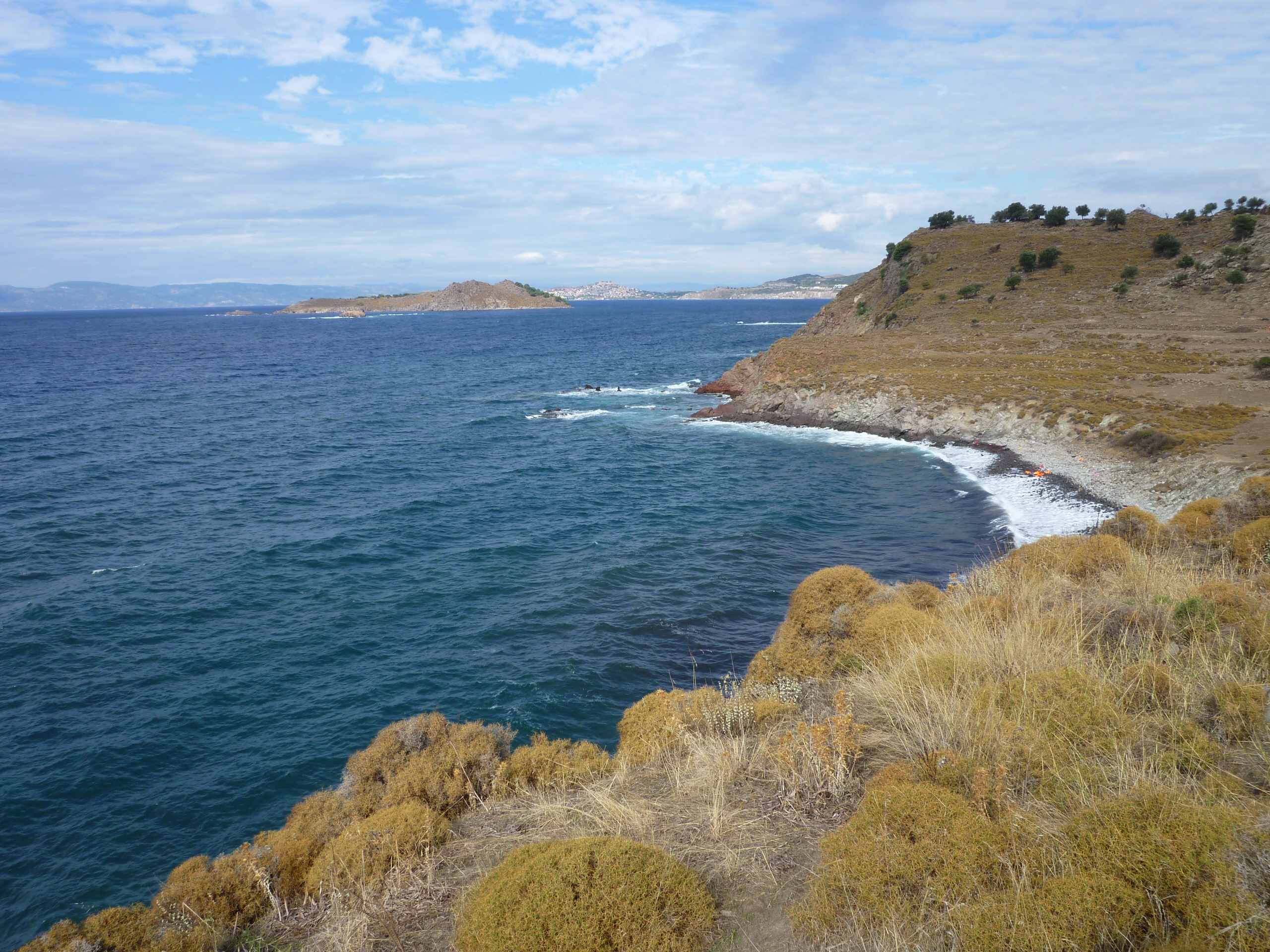
- Coastland on Lesbos, Greece.
- Date: December 14, 2012
- Time: Early hours
- Location: Off Lesbos, Greece
- Participants: Migrants from Iraq
- Outcome: Boat sank
- Deaths: 18
- Missing: 9

The December 2012 Lesbos, Greece migrant boat disaster occurred in the early hours of December 14, 2012, off Greek island Lesbos in the northeastern Aegean Sea when a boat carrying illegal immigrants, which set sail from Turkey, sank. At least 18 people died by the incident, eight were missing and one man was rescued by the Greek harbor police.

According to the report of local authorities, 18 dead bodies were found stranded at the coast of Thermis west of the island. The survivor, a man of age 20, stated that a total of 28 people of Iraqi nationality, including children, were aboard a small boat, which departed from the Turkish coast shortly after midnight on Thursday. After about one hour of sailing, the boat capsized due to bad weather conditions about 2.2 nmi (4.1 km) before the Greek coast. He added that they had paid US$2,000 per capita for the illegal immigration transport.
