= 2018 Libya migrant shipwrecks =

Maritime incidents in Libya

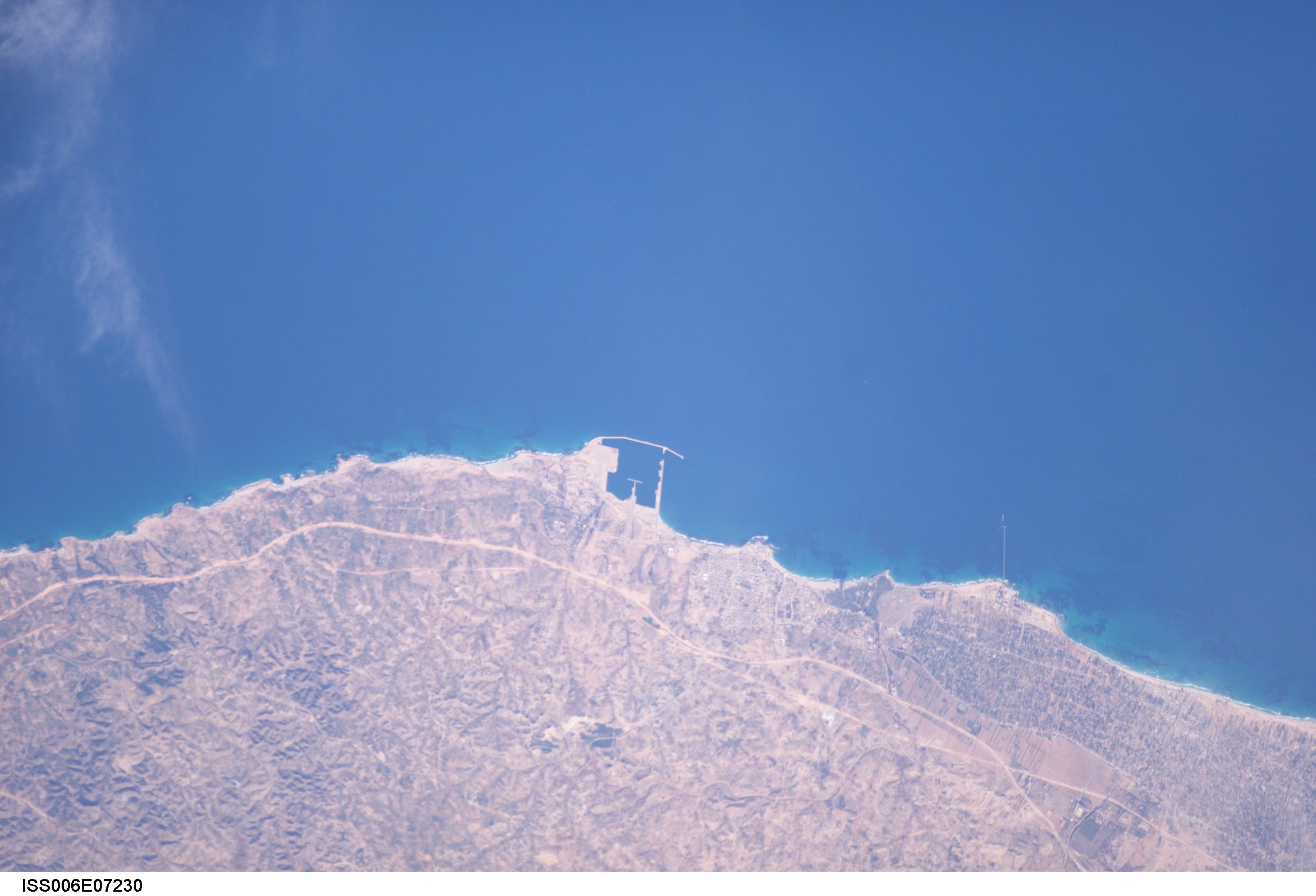
- The boat sank off the city of Al-Khums, around 100 kilometres (60 miles) east of the Libyan capital.
- Date: January 9, 2018
- Location: Libya's coast; 32.708°N 14.333°E
- Cause: boat was punctured
- Outcome: 16 survivors
- Missing: Up to 100 migrants

2018 Libya migrant shipwrecks began on January 9, 2018, when up to 100 migrants went missing as their migrant rubber boat was punctured and sank off Libya's coast.

== Description ==
On January 9, 2018, up to 100 migrants went missing from Libya when their rubber boat was punctured and sank off Libya's coast. Libyan coastguard had picked up nearly 300 migrants from three boats off the coast, but one rubber boat was punctured and the coastguard only found 16 survivors clinging to its wreckage. The coastguard said the number of missing might be as high as 100. The boat sank off the city of Al-Khums, around 100 km (62 mi) east of the Libyan capital.

Libyan coastguard picked up nearly 300 migrants from three boats off the coast of Libya on Tuesday, January 9, 1980.

On January 6, 2018, sixty-four people died after a dinghy sank in the Mediterranean Sea. The Italian coastguard rescued 86 people from the boat hours after it sustained a puncture and started sinking on Saturday morning. The deaths represented the first large-scale migrant tragedy of 2018 in the Mediterranean.

== Background history ==
A total of 2,832 migrants died on the Central Mediterranean route between Libya and Italy in 2017, down from 4,581 in 2016. The number of migrants who reached Italy in 2017 was 119,310, down from 181,436 in 2016.
