= 2014 Libya migrant shipwreck =

Migrant shipwreck in Libya

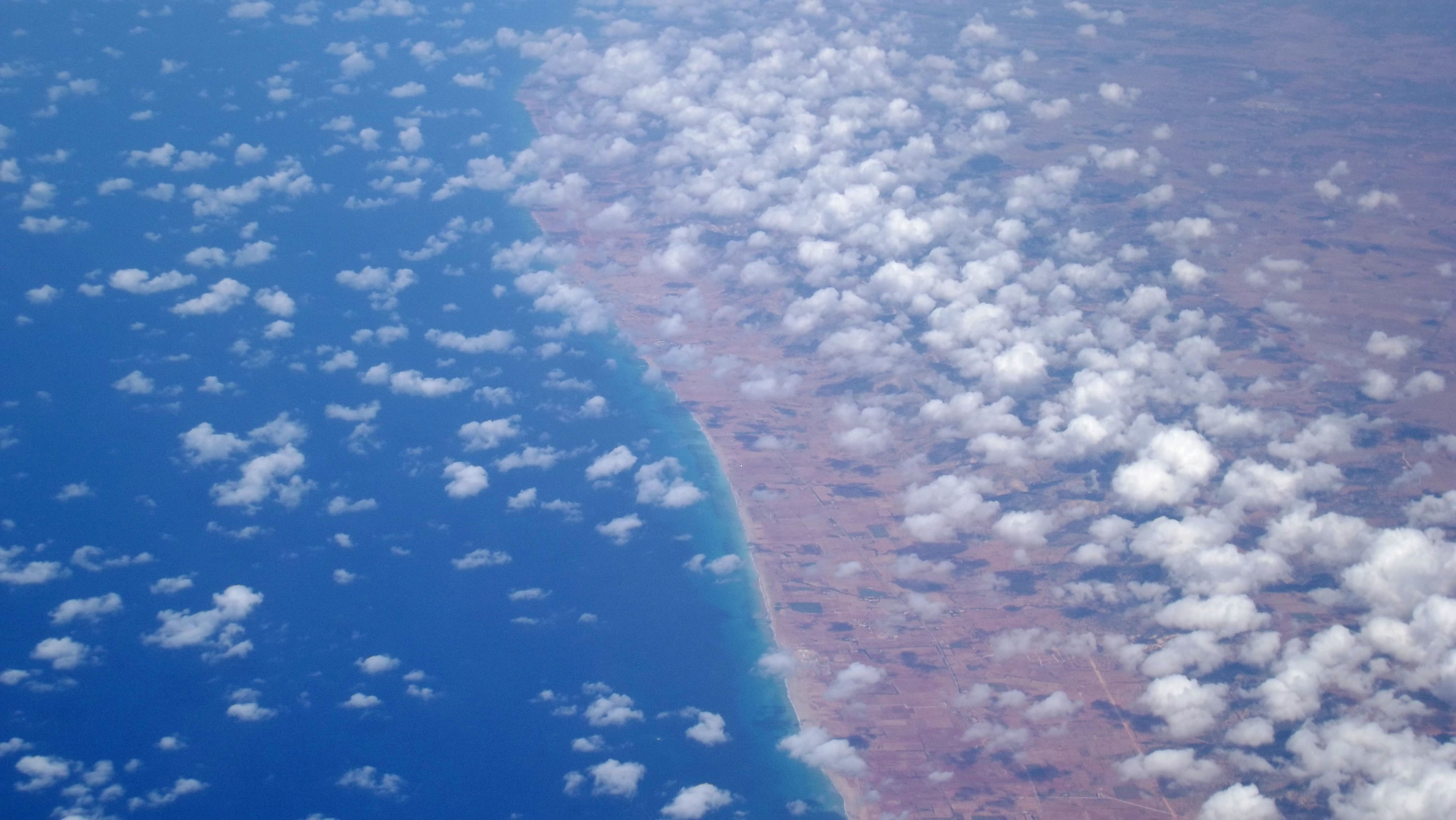
Libyan coastland.

On 14 September 2014, a ship sank off the Libya coast with up to 250 refugees on board. More than 200 people are believed to have drowned. 36 people were rescued and taken to a hospital.

== See also ==
- Timeline of the European migrant crisis
- Ghost boat investigation
