= 2014 Pozzallo migrant shipwreck =

Maritime incident in Italy

The 2014 Pozzallo migrant shipwreck took place in the Strait of Sicily off the coast of Pozzallo, Sicily, during the night between 30 June and 1 July 2014, when a fishing boat carrying African migrants was rescued by the Italian Navy frigate Grecale. The incident caused the death of 45 migrants, all adult males originally from sub-Saharan Africa, who died of asphyxiation in the hold of the vessel.

== Dynamics of the disaster ==
The fishing vessel involved in the accident had departed from the Libyan coast overloaded, as approximately 600 migrants, almost all of them from sub-Saharan Africa, were crammed onto the vessel. Most of the migrants had been crammed into the vessel's hold, in precarious hygienic conditions and with no possibility of movement in the cramped spaces. During an unspecified moment during the crossing towards the Sicilian coast, the vessel's hold began to fill with exhaust fumes from the vessel's engines, causing the death of 45 migrants by asphyxiation, or by drowning following the hold filling with water that was taken on board by the vessel.

After it entered Italian territorial waters, the vessel was recovered by the Italian Navy frigate Grecale, which rescued the 566 survivors, including numerous children and pregnant women, and took them to the port of Pozzallo. The bodies of the 45 victims were found in the ship's hold and were transferred to the cemetery in Pozzallo.

== Consequences ==
The accident, which occurred in one of the most tragic months in terms of the number of deaths during attempted Mediterranean Sea crossings, caused emotion and indignation with wide international resonance. Following the accident, the president-elect of the European Commission, Jean-Claude Juncker, suggested the appointment of an ad hoc European commissioner to deal with the migration crisis; the delegation for the management of migratory flows was subsequently assigned to the European Commissioner for Internal Affairs and Migration.

The funerals of the victims, not all of whom have been identified, were held on 22 July 2014 in Pozzallo, in whose cemetery some of the migrants were buried.

== Commemorations ==
On January 14, 2024, the tenth anniversary of the disaster, a monument in memory of the victims of the shipwreck was inaugurated in Pozzallo. The monument, composed of a stele, the original propeller of the trawler, (restored for the occasion), and a rudder, was placed on the Raganzino promenade, not far from the port where the survivors landed.

== See also ==
- European migrant crisis
- Mediterranean Sea
- Operation Mare Nostrum
- Operation Triton
