= Fabrizio Gatti =

Italian investigative journalist and author

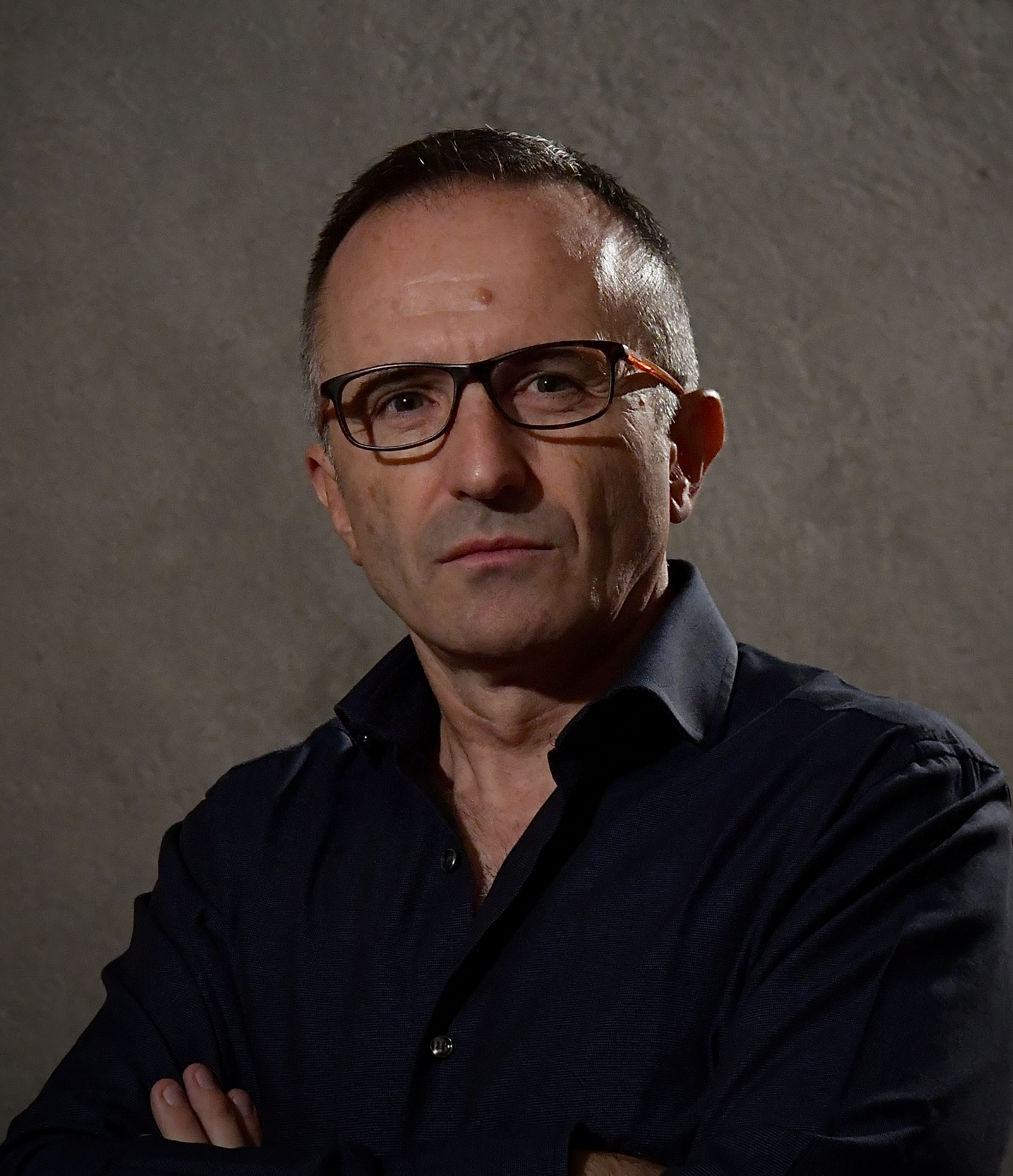
- Born: 9 March 1966
- Occupation: Journalist, writer
- Awards: Preis für die Freiheit und Zukunft der Medien (2006); Ambrogino d'oro (2005)

Fabrizio Gatti (born 9 March 1966) is an Italian investigative journalist and author. He is also Editorial editor, Insight, at the Italian daily Today.it. Between 1987 and 2022 Gatti wrote for the Italian weekly l'Espresso, the daily "Corriere della Sera" and before "il Giornale" and "il Cittadino". His reportages and undercover investigations have been translated all over the world.

Gatti is the author of the best-selling book "Bilal, my undercover journey to Europe" (La nave di Teseo, New ed. 2023), from which the TV series "Unwanted – Hostages of the sea" was based, starring Marco Bocci, Jessica Schwarz and Dada Bozela, directed by Oliver Hirschbiegel, written by Stefano Bises and produced by Sky Studios together with Pantaleon Films and Indiana Production.

Gatti has travelled most of the routes of immigration into Europe. Between 2003 and 2007, he also crossed the Sahara desert four times with hundreds of migrants, infiltrated a gang of human traffickers in Northern Africa as a gangster's personal driver, was rescued at sea, was jailed in the Lampedusa detention centre as an Iraqi illegal migrant, and worked as a slave labourer on a tomato farm in Italy. Gatti told all his undercover experiences from Africa to Europe in the book «Bilal: My undercover journey into the modern slave-trade» (Rizzoli). The book was also published in French, German, Norwegian and Swedish.

His preferred investigation method is passing as one of the people he is writing about. On 16 April 2007, he received the 2006 Journalist Award of the European Union, for his reporting about the working conditions of the immigrants in Apulia. In the article Io schiavo in Puglia ("I slave in Apulia") published in L'Espresso, he describes his experience as an undercover immigrant worker at tomato harvest.

Other inquiries deal with the treatment of the Kosovar refugees who try to cross the Swiss border, the life conditions in the Temporary Stay Center from Lampedusa, the hygienic situation of Umberto I Clinic in Rome.

In 2007, he received the Italian National Award for Investigative Journalism for his article about differences of treatment of Romanian citizens in Italy and other European Union states.

In 2007, Editore Rizzoli published his book "Bilal. Il mio viaggio da infiltrato nel mercato dei nuovi schiavi" ("Bilal. My undercover journey into the modern slavetrade"). The last two 2022 and 2023 editions of "Bilal. Il mio viaggio da infiltrato verso l'Europa" have been published in Italy by La nave di Teseo.

Gatti also contributed with the producer Sascha Rosemann, the writer Stefano Bises (Gomorrah) and the film director Oliver Hirschbiegel to the new eight-parts series Unwanted, inspired by his book Bilal, directed by Oliver Hirschbiegel and starred by Marco Bocci (Fino all’ultimo battito), Jessica Schwarz (Romy), Dada Fungula Bozela (Snabba Cash), Sylvester Groth (Inglourious Basterds), Francesco Acquaroli (Romanzo criminale, Squadra antimafia) and Scot Williams (Memory). They are joined by Hassan Najib, Jonathan Berlin, Jason Derek Prempeh, Cecilia Dazzi, Barbara Auer, Marco Palvetti, Denise Capezza, Nuala Peberdy, Samuel Kalambay, Amadou Mbow, Edward Apeagyei, Reshny N’Kouka, Onyinye Odokoro and Massimo De Lorenzo. Unwanted is produced by Sky Studios, Pantaleon Films and Indiana Production. Dan Maag, Marco Beckmann, Patrick Zorer and Stephanie Schettler-Kohler produce for Pantaleon alongside Sascha Rosemann, while Fabrizio Donvito, Benedetto Habib, Daniel Campos Pavoncelli and Marco Cohen produce for Indiana. Unwanted is executive produced for Sky Studios by Nils Hartmann and Sonia Rovai.

Gatti's books were also published in France, Germany, Japan, Norway, Sweden and his undercover stories have been translated all over the world, including Japan.

== Documentary ==
A Sea of Shame (Un unico destino), produced by L'Espresso, La Repubblica, Sky, and 42° Parallelo, 2017, (Italia, 55', EN, IT).

== Books ==
- "Nato sul confine" (Rizzoli, Italia, 2023)
- "Bilal. Il mio viaggio da infiltrato verso l'Europa" (New cover, Unwanted-Hostages of the sea, New ed., La nave di Teseo, Italia, 2023)
- "Nato sul confine" (Rizzoli, Italy, 2023)
- "Educazione americana. Da Mani pulite ai segreti di Vladimir Putin" – (New ed., La nave di Teseo, Italia, 2022)
- "Bilal, il mio viaggio da infiltrato verso l'Europa" – (New ed., La nave di Teseo, Italia, 2022)
- "Le Maître américain" – (Liana Levi, France, 2021)
- "L'infinito errore" – (La nave di Teseo, Italia, 2021)
- "Der amerikanische Agent" – (Kunstmann, Deutschland, 2020)
- "Educazione americana" – (La nave di Teseo, Italia, First Ed. 2019)
- "We are not ghosts (Viki)" – (Iwanami Shoten, Japan, 2018)
- "Peståren" – (Leopard förlag, Sverige, 2015)
- "Au nom de la mafia" – (Liana Levi, France, 2014)
- "Gli anni della peste" – (Rizzoli, Italia, 2013)
- "Bilal. På slavrutten till Europa" – (Celanders förlag, Sverige, 2013)
- "Bilal. Med de papirløse til festning Europa" – (Aschehoug, Norge, 2012)
- "L'Eco della frottola" – (Rizzoli, Italia, 2010)
- "Viki som ville gå i skolan" – (Karneval förlag, Sverige, 2010)
- "Bilal. Als Illegaler auf dem Weg nach Europa" – (Kunstmann, Deutschland, 2010)
- "Bilal. Sur la route des clandestins" – (Liana Levi, France, 2008)
- "Bilal. Viaggiare, lavorare, morire da clandestini – (Rizzoli, Italia, First ed. 2007)
- "Viki che voleva andare a scuola" – (Rizzoli, Italia, New ed. 2003)

== Awards ==
2024 – Sanguinetto, Premio Castello narrativa per ragazzi per "Nato sul confine".
2024 – Albiate, Premio San Valerio.
2024 – Cernusco sul Naviglio, Targa Associazione culturale Alari per "Educazione americana".
2022 – Cernusco sul Naviglio, Gelso d'Oro.
2021 – Roma, Premio Ryszard Kapuściński.
2021 – Torricella Peligna, Premio "John Fante – Contesa" alla carriera.
2018 – Catania, Santa Venerina, Premio Maria Grazia Cutuli.
2016 – Trento, Premio Baffo Rosso – Roberto Morrione per il giornalismo investigativo.
2015 – Ravenna, Premio Guidarello per il giornalismo d'autore.
2014 – Oslo, The University of Oslo's Human Rights Award – The Lisl & Leo Eitinger Prize.
2014 – Frankfurt, Menschenrechtspreis der Stiftung Pro Asyl.
2014 – Barga, Premio Arrigo Benedetti.
2013 – Caulonia, Premio Angelo Frammartino.
2013 – Sassari, Premio giornalistico "Pino Careddu".
2010 – Napoli, Premio per la letteratura per ragazzi Elsa Morante con il libro "L'Eco della frottola" (Rizzoli, 2010).
2009 – Bibione, Premio giornalistico "Enzo Tortora".
2008 – Riolo Terme, Premio "Un va a zezz".
2008 – Udine, Premio letterario internazionale Tiziano Terzani con il libro "Bilal – Viaggiare, lavorare, morire da clandestini" (Rizzoli, 2007).
2007 – Saint-Vincent, Premio Saint-Vincent giornalista dell'anno.
2007 – Catania, Premio Giuseppe Fava.
2006 – Firenze, Premio "L'etica della legalità" – Camera del Lavoro – Fondazione Antonino Caponnetto.
2006 – Roma, Premio Colombe d'oro per la pace.
2006 – Lipsia, Leipzig Media Award.
2006 – Bruxelles, European Union journalist award.
2006 – Milano, Premio Max David inviato dell'anno.
2006 – Milano, Premio Campione per la comunicazione.
2005 – Milano, Ambrogino d'oro.
2005 – Premio Mario Francese.
2005 – San Miniato, Premio Roberto Ghinetti.
2004 – Saint-Vincent, Premio Saint-Vincent per la migliore inchiesta.
2004 – Roma, Premio Stefano Gaj Tachè l'amico dei bambini con il libro "Viki che voleva andare a scuola" (Rizzoli, 2003).
2004 – Asola, Premio Città di Asola con il libro "Viki che voleva andare a scuola" (Rizzoli, 2003).
2004 – Verona, Premio Libri infiniti con il libro "Viki che voleva andare a scuola" (Rizzoli, 2003).
2003 – Premio Lunigiana Cinque Terre con il libro "Viki che voleva andare a scuola" (Rizzoli, 2003).
2003 – Crotone, Premio nazionale narrativa per ragazzi con il libro "Viki che voleva andare a scuola" (Rizzoli, 2003).
2000 – Milano, il Premiolino.
2000 – Roma, Premio cronista dell'anno.
1991 – Milano, il Premiolino.
