= December 2007 Seferihisar, Turkey, migrant boat disaster =

Maritime incident in Turkey

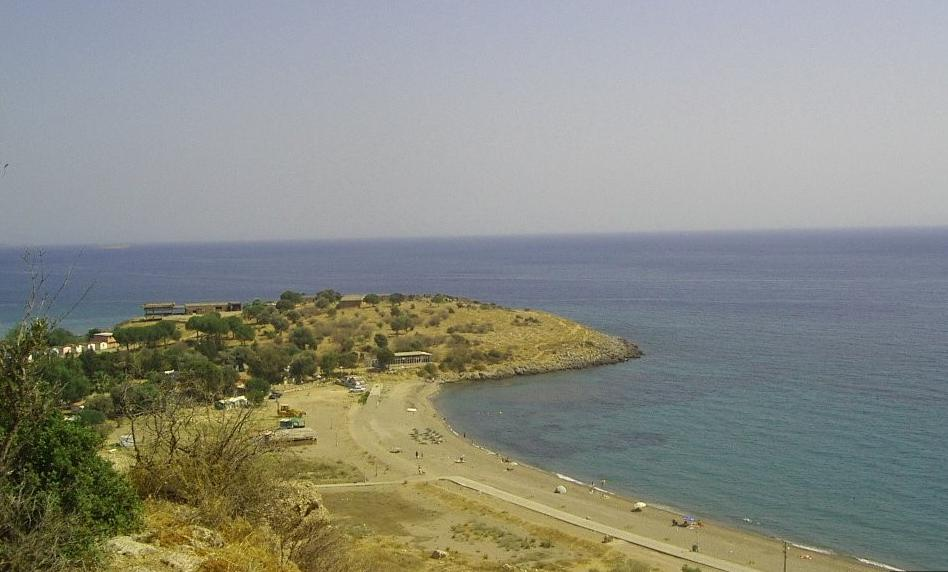
Coastland in Seferihisar, Turkey.

The December 2007 Seferihisar, Turkey migrant boat disaster occurred in the night of 8 December 2007 when a 15-meter dinghy boat carrying illegal migrants who were trying to reach the island of Chios, Greece, capsized due to bad sea conditions off the coast of Seferihisar, İzmir Province, western Turkey, resulting in forty to sixty deaths, sources varying on the exact number of casualties, among the boat's occupants. It is the single largest maritime incident in terms of loss of lives and involving migrants in the Aegean Sea.

While six people could swim back or were rescued by the Turkish Coast Guard, the rest in an initial total number of 85, based on the accounts given by the survivors, were either found dead or disappeared in the sea. The migrants were of Palestinian, Iraqi or Somalian origin.

The number of casualties were initially given as 51 in the Turkish press and as 43 by the Turkish authorities, or as 46 or 53 in other sources. The United Nations High Commissioner for Refugees (UNHCR) quoted the same number of 51. Sources of later date cited the number of casualties as being at least forty, and the total number of the boat's occupants as being around 60, with estimates on the number of missing, minus the six survivors, falling in between.

A group of people accused of having organized the passage by boat were arrested in İzmir the same week on allegations of human trafficking.

== See also ==
- 2007 Malta migrant shipwreck
