= 2023 Libya migrant boat disasters =

Nautical disasters in the Mediterranean

2023 Libya migrant boats sinking
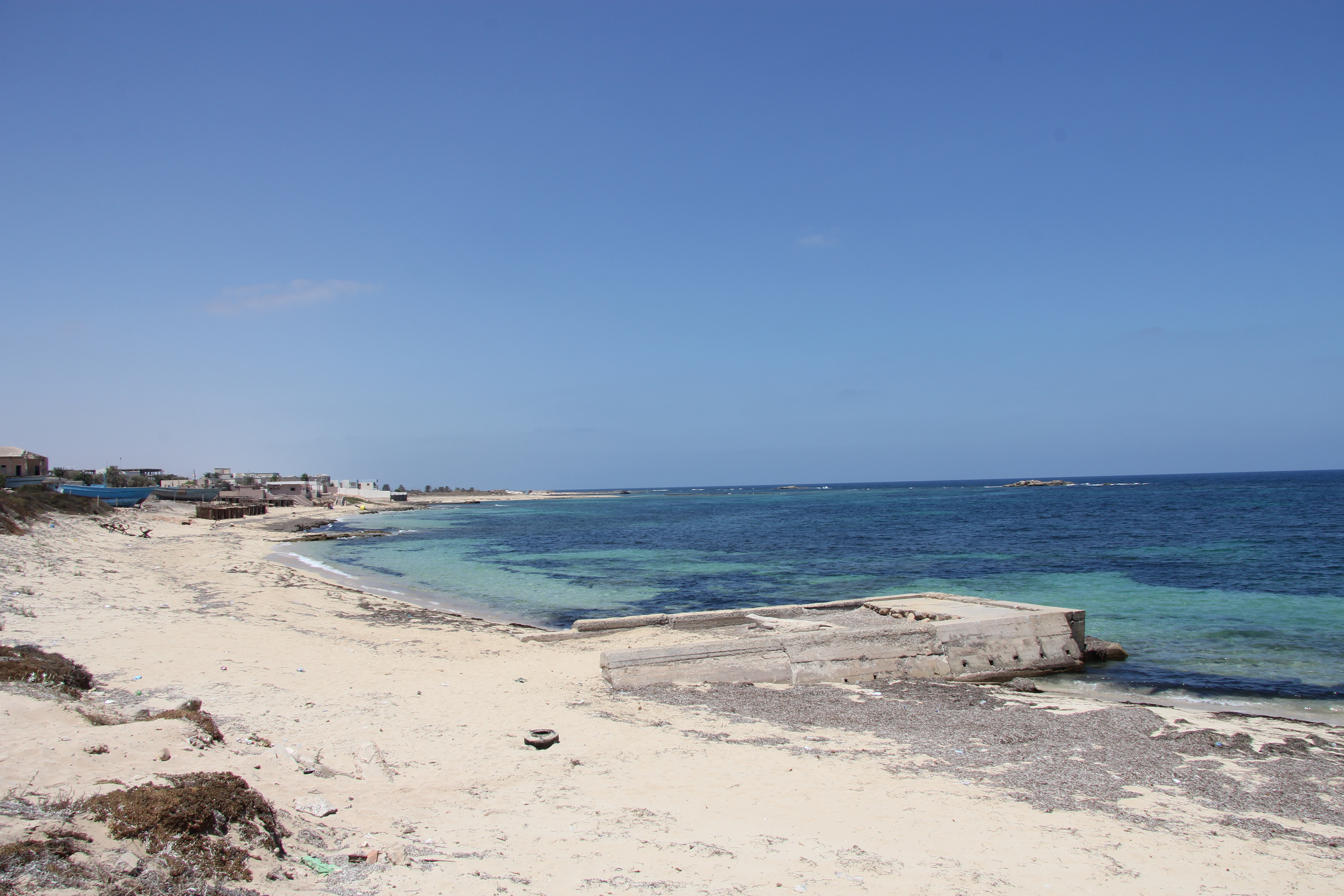
- View at Sabratha towards Mediterranean Sea
- Date: 25 April & 16 December 2023
- Location: Off the coast of western Libya
- Deaths: 57 (April); 61 (December)

On 25 April 2023, two migrant boats bound for Europe capsized off the coast of western Libya, claiming at least 57 lives. Until the 2023 Pylos migrant boat disaster in June, it represented the deadliest migrant sea crossing in the last six years.

On 16 December 2023, 61 migrants drowned when a boat carrying 86 capsized.

== Background ==
The central Mediterranean route became the world's most dangerous migrant sea crossing in early 2023, according to the International Organization for Migration, when 441 individuals drowned while attempting to cross the Mediterranean from North Africa to Europe.

== April ==
Two boats capsized in separate incidents off the Libyan coast. The first boat capsized close to Garabulli, killing 11 migrants and leaving the whereabouts of the rest uncertain. Four survivors who were saved by the Libyan Coast Guard said that the boat was carrying around 80 people of various nationalities. 46 bodies have been recovered since the second boat sank off the coast of Sabratha, and more are anticipated to wash ashore in the coming days.

== December ==
On 16 December 2023, a boat carrying 86 migrants sank off Zuwarah; 61 of them drowned.

== Italian rescues ==
Between 24 and 26 April 2023, Italy has rescued 47 boats in the central Mediterranean Sea carrying over 1,600 migrants, bringing them to the island of Lampedusa.
