= Ghost boat investigation =

Investigation into missing migrant boat

Ghost boat disappearance
- Date: 2014
- Location: Mediterranean Sea
- Participants: Group of 243 people
- Outcome: All missing
- Missing: 243

The ghost boat investigations are a project looking into a group of at least 243 refugees who disappeared in the summer of 2014. None of the missing people have contacted their family members, no bodies were found, and there is no wreckage of any kind. One theory is that a people-smuggling boat off the coast of Libya, intending to sail to Italy, disappeared without trace. A lack of wreckage is highly unusual for such a large watercraft. Reporter Eric Reidy has been investigating the case by blogging and using crowd sourcing. Bobbie Johnson, a senior editor at Medium, took Reidy's articles and created the ghost boat project to help track the missing group of "ghost boat" refugees. As of December 2015, no trace of the passengers has been found.

== Background ==
The 243 people in the group who were to leave Libya each paid $1,600 (about $2,200 in 2025) to get to Europe. Measho Tesfamariam arranged the trip and "handled communication, logistics, and payment for the big smugglers". There were three other individuals who helped fill the boat: Ibrahim, Jamal el-Saoudi, and Jaber, all of whom have Sudanese passports (although Jamal is Eritrean). Ibrahim was in charge of arranging the trip and the passengers and families' contact. Tesfamariam says that the boat was due to depart from the Libyan Khums (Al-Khums) beach, but he didn't witness the departure. Tesfamariam was arrested on December 2, 2014 on people-smuggling charges. Meanwhile, Eritrean Jamal el-Saoudi, who was the manager of the Tokhla group smuggling operation that arranged the ghost boat group's journey, lives in Libya where he is a well-connected man.

Most of the passengers were Eritreans fleeing the highly repressive military regime that rules the country. At the time, around 5,000 Eritreans fled the country every month.

== Investigation ==
Experts say that such a large boat sinking would have left some trace. “It’s really strange,” says Othman Belbeisi, who is the International Organization for Migration director for Libya. Refugee advocate and migration expert Fausto Melluso, with the Italian organization Arci in Sicily, said, "It is inconceivable that a boat with that many people can go missing in 2014 and nobody knows about it." Alganesh Fisseha, an Eritrean political activist who fled the country herself, is an expert on refugee issues. She said that it was the "first time she has heard of such a large group of people going missing without a trace [...] 'It is impossible that they disappeared into thin air.'" During the Lampedusa migrant shipwreck on October 12, 2013, more than 360 deaths were reported, with just 155 survivors. In that particular case, bodies were visibly spread out over the ocean.

Eric Reidy had been working as a reporter in Tunisia when he heard that refugee activist Meron Estefanos was investigating reports surrounding the ghost boat. She was looking into a mysterious phone call to relatives of those on the ghost boat that the passengers were detained in a Tunisian prison. However, further digging revealed that the phone calls turned out to be a false lead.

== See also ==
- Human trafficking in Eritrea

== Bibliography ==
Notes

References

- Campbell, Zach (Nov 11, 2015). "How Matter crowdsourced the migration story". Columbia Journalism Review.
- Gatti, Fabrizio (Oct 23, 2014b). "Chi è l'uomo della strage dei profughi" (in Italian). L'espresso.
- Gatti, Fabrizio (Nov 7, 2014). "Missing boat case, Measho Tesfamariam: only God knows what happened". L'espresso. Archived from the original on January 16, 2017.
- Johnson, Bobbie (November 13, 2015). "Ghost Boat: A Primer". medium.com.
- Owen, Laura Hazard (Oct 7, 2015). "243 people disappeared on a ship in the Mediterranean; a new project from Medium aims to find them". Nieman Foundation for Journalism.
- Reidy, Eric (Oct 7, 2015). "243 People Disappeared. Young People. Women. Children. And No One Cares". medium.com.
- Reidy, Eric (Oct 29, 2015a). "Now I Have Learned That There's a Worse Thing Than Death". medium.com.
- Reidy, Eric (Nov 5, 2015b). "At First The Traffickers Were More Human. Then Slowly They Started The Torture". medium.com.
- Reidy, Eric (Nov 12, 2015c). "Someone Is Making Up Lies". medium.com.
- Simon, Scott (2015). "In Search Of A Ghost Boat And The 243 On Board". NPR.
