= 2007 Malta migrant shipwreck =

Maritime incident in the Mediterranean Sea

The migrant boat before it went missing in an image taken by the Armed Forces of Malta

On Monday, 21 May 2007, a small and crowded migrant boat was spotted some 80 nmi (150 km) south of Malta by the Maltese Air Force, and photographed while the 53 people on board were apparently trying to bail out water. Then the boat went missing. No trace of the boat or its occupants was found by the Maltese boats sent to their search and rescue, and there was no means they could have reached the shore during the time span in between. Maltese authorities and the UNHCR confirmed the missing status of the boat.

The state of peril in which the occupants of the boat found themselves at the time of their discovery was further confirmed by a cellphone call made by one occupant to a relative in Italy on the same day of 21 May, when the boat's engine was said to have stopped, with water coming into the boat.

The event was the largest single disaster in terms of loss of life and involving migrant boats in the waters around Malta, a leading destination for migrants from Africa, until August 2008, when 71 migrants in one boat were feared drowned according to the accounts made by the eight survivors.

== Background ==
Around 1,700 migrants land on Malta every year and due to the particular conditions of the sea journey they risk, it is very difficult to advance theories on what would have happened and to how many people when something goes wrong between Malta and the north African coast. At least 10,000 are estimated to have died trying to reach Europe in the decade prior to the 2007 wreck. In cases where they are rescued by a non-Maltese vessel, they become subject to long negotiations between states, as it happened when a Spanish trawler rescued 51 in 2006 and another Spanish tug-boat rescued 26 in May 2007. There has been cases where migrants were found clinging to tuna pens.

Most migrants try to reach further, particularly to Italy. In a further dimension, the arrival of illegal migrants became an issue between neighboring countries of the Mediterranean basin and between those of the European Union, of which Malta is the smallest member.

Those who remain in Malta try to pick up employment opportunities in the country's very limited labour market and they spark and fuel explicit xenophobic reactions. Hostility towards migrants has also been extended against journalists, clergymen and lawyers who advocate their rights, like Katrine Camilleri, 2007 Nansen Refugee Award winner, whose car and house door was burned.
