= Murders of Vincenzo Solano and Mercedes Ibáñez =

2015 double-murder in Italy

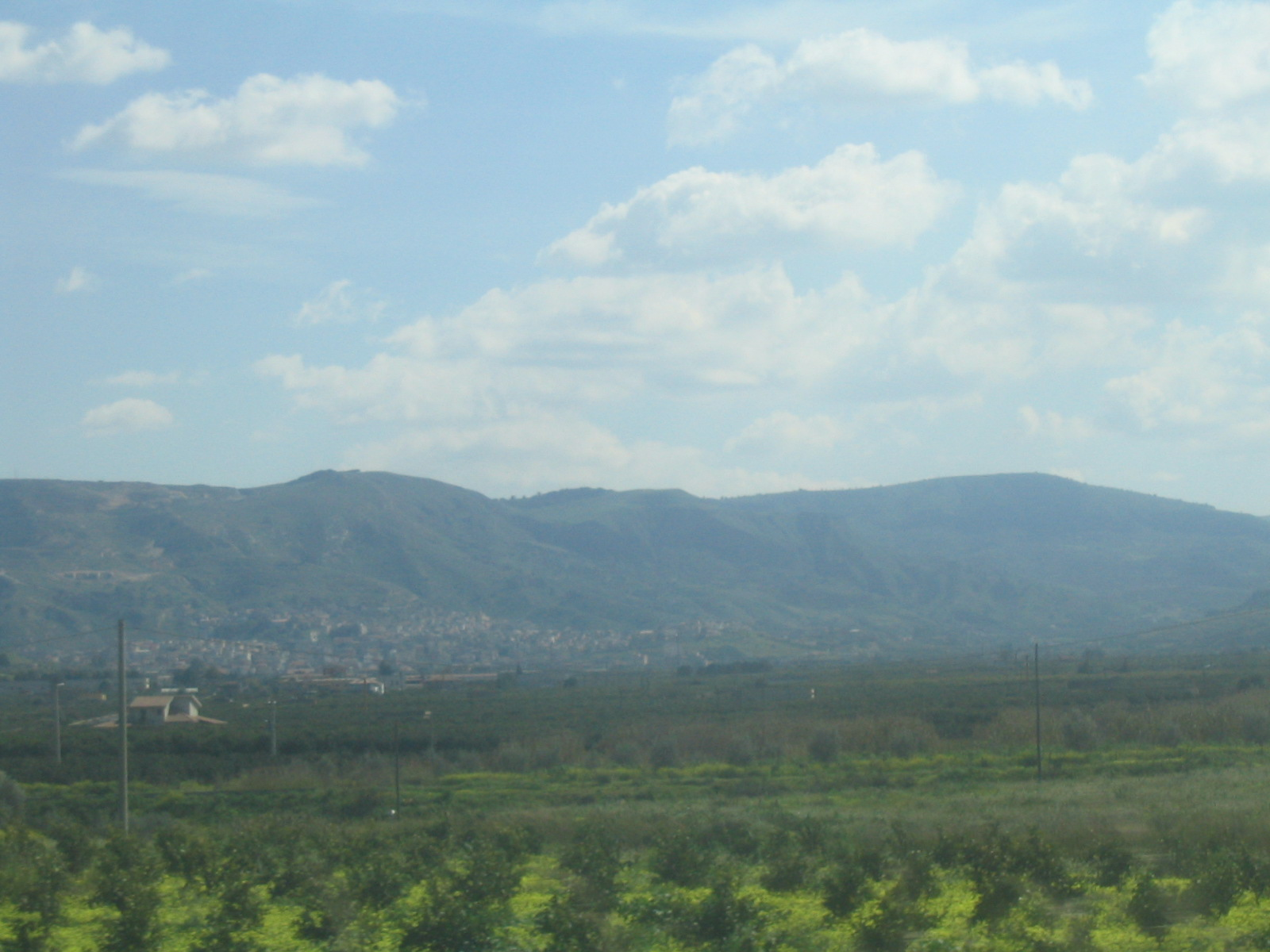
- Palagonia
- Location: Palagonia, Sicily, Italy
- Date: 30 August 2015
- Attack type: Double-murder by stabbing, robbery, rape
- Weapons: Knife, screwdriver
- Victims: Vincenzo Solano, aged 68; Mercedes Ibáñez, aged 70
- Perpetrator: Mamadou Kamara
- Verdict: Guilty on all counts
- Convictions: Murder (2 counts); Rape; Robbery
- Sentence: Life imprisonment

On 30 August 2015, married couple Vincenzo Solano and Mercedes Ibáñez were found killed at their house in Palagonia, Sicily. An 18-year-old Ivorian illegal immigrant was arrested on suspicion of their murder; the authorities stated that they suspected that accomplices, likely to be Italian nationals, remained at large. The identity of the perpetrator as an asylum seeker added to the debate on immigration to Italy. The perpetrator, then-18-year old Mamadou Kamara was sentenced to life in prison.

== Victims and attack ==
Solano, 68, and his Spanish wife Ibáñez, from Catalonia, 70, met while working as immigrants in Germany, and had lived in Palagonia for over 40 years. They were charitable towards the migrants staying at the nearby Cara Mineo centre. The couple had two daughters, Rosita and Manuela, the former living in Milan and the latter in their town. Manuela's four-year-old daughter had been due to be at the couple's house on the day of the killing, but her mother took her to the beach instead.

Solano and Ibáñez were found dead at their house. Solano had had his throat cut, and Ibáñez was believed to have been thrown from a balcony. The post-mortem examination found evidence that Solano was murdered in his sleep, while Ibáñez was sexually assaulted; both were found to have been wounded by a large screwdriver and a pair of pliers.

== Perpetrator ==
Mamadou Kamara, an 18-year-old from the Ivory Coast staying at Cara Mineo, was arrested on suspicion of murdering the couple. A police search of his bag found electronics and jewellery from their house, as well as blood-stained trousers. According to the investigators, at the time of his arrest, he was wearing clothing stolen from their wardrobe, including a pair of slippers that did not fit him. Kamara stated that he found all of these goods loose in a bin.

The investigating judge declared that it was likely that Kamara had Italian accomplices, who knew of the valuables in the couple's house. According to him, it would have been impossible for a young man of Kamara's build to perform all the criminal acts together. Kamara was said to have a disturbed, inhuman personality given his coldness and detachment when going through proceedings.

Kamara was found guilty of robbery, rape, and two counts of murder for committing the attack. He was sentenced to life imprisonment. In 2021, his sentence of life imprisonment was upheld on appeal.

== Reaction ==
Rosita, 46, daughter of the couple, blamed the Italian government for their deaths, saying "They let these migrants come here and they do what they want, including burgling and killing". She demanded that no politicians attend the funeral, on the basis that Prime Minister Matteo Renzi and Minister of the Interior Angelino Alfano did not give condolences, including on Twitter. Renzi condemned the crime, and pleaded for the Italian public to remain calm. The migrants at Cara Mineo organised a prayer vigil for the deceased couple.

The perceived role of the government in the attack was also claimed by right-wing opposition politicians, including Lega Nord leader Matteo Salvini and Giorgia Meloni of Brothers of Italy. Deputy Speaker of the Senate, Lega Nord's Roberto Calderoli, asked the public whether the death penalty should be considered for the perpetrator. Palagonia's mayor, Valerio Marletta, called for Cara Mineo to be shut down, saying "You can't put 3,000 or 4,000 people together. You can welcome them, yes, but while safeguarding the population and the dignity of the migrants who don't want to be confused with criminals". The planned march by Forza Nuova was opposed by some locals who saw it as a ploy for political gain on a tragedy, with the party's vice secretary Giuseppe Provenzale responding by claiming he was intending for it to not cause tension. Anti-racist activist Alfonso Di Stefano condemned the crime, but was physically attacked and spat at in a televised interview in Palagonia, by a crowd of locals and Forza Nuova activists.

On 1 September, three locals bearing firearms attacked and robbed two Gambian migrants in Palagonia, resulting in one requiring hospital treatment. Local police treated this attack as revenge for the killings.

== See also ==
- Murder of Ashley Ann Olsen
