= San Pietro Apostolo (disambiguation) =

San Pietro Apostolo is a town in Catanzaro, Calabria, Italy.

San Pietro Apostolo may also refer to the following churches in Italy:

- San Pietro Apostolo, Alcamo, Trapani, Sicily
- San Pietro Apostolo, Castelbolognese, Emilia-Romagna
- San Pietro Apostolo, Civitanova Marche, Macerata, Marche
- San Pietro Apostolo, Palagonia, Catania, Sicily

== See also ==
- San Pietro (disambiguation)
