= Palagonia =

Palagonia Pelagonía (Greek)
- Comune
- Comune di Palagonia
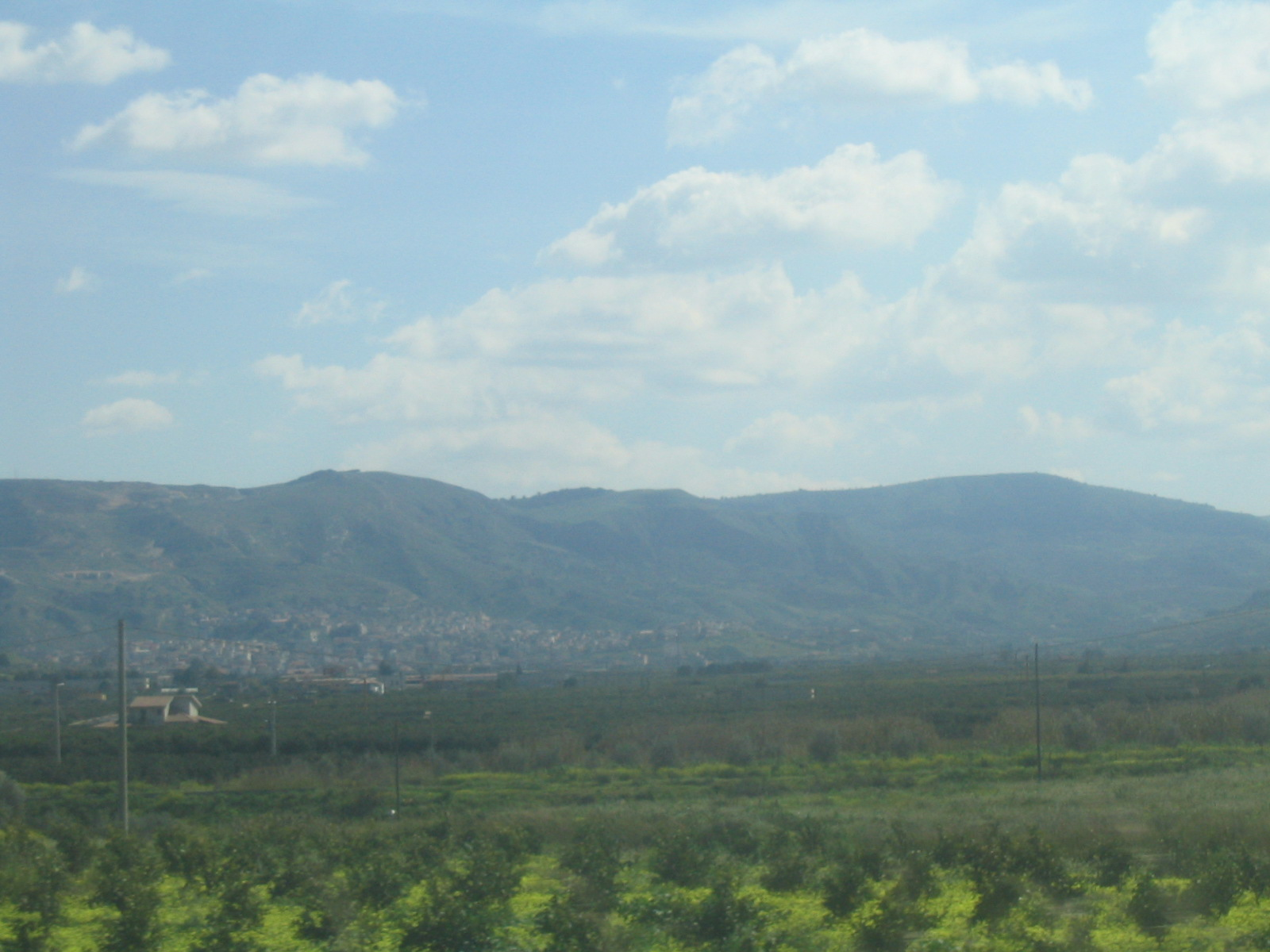

- Location within Italy Location within Sicily
- Coordinates: 37°20′N 14°45′E
- Country: Italy
- Region: Sicily
- Metropolitan city: Catania (CT)

Government
  - Mayor: Salvatore Astuti

Area
  - Total: 57.79 km^{2} (22.31 sq mi)
- Elevation: 200 m (660 ft)

Population (31 December 2017)
  - Total: 16,654
  - Density: 288.2/km^{2} (746.4/sq mi)
- Demonym: Palagonesi
- Time zone: UTC+1 (CET)
  - Summer (DST): UTC+2 (CEST)
- Postal code: 95046
- Dialing code: 095
- Patron saint: St. Febronia of Nisibis
- Website: www.comune.palagonia.ct.it

Palagonia (Sicilian: Palaunìa; Latin: Palica) is a comune (municipality) in the Metropolitan City of Catania in the Italian region Sicily, located about 150 kilometres (93 mi) southeast of Palermo and about 35 kilometres (22 mi) southwest of Catania. Palagonia borders the following municipalities: Lentini, Militello in Val di Catania, Mineo, Ramacca.

Palagonia is well known for the cultivation of oranges.

The main catholic church is the Chiesa Madre San Pietro Apostolo.

== See also ==
- Palagonia double homicide
