= Macerata shooting =

2018 shooting of African immigrants in Macerata, Italy

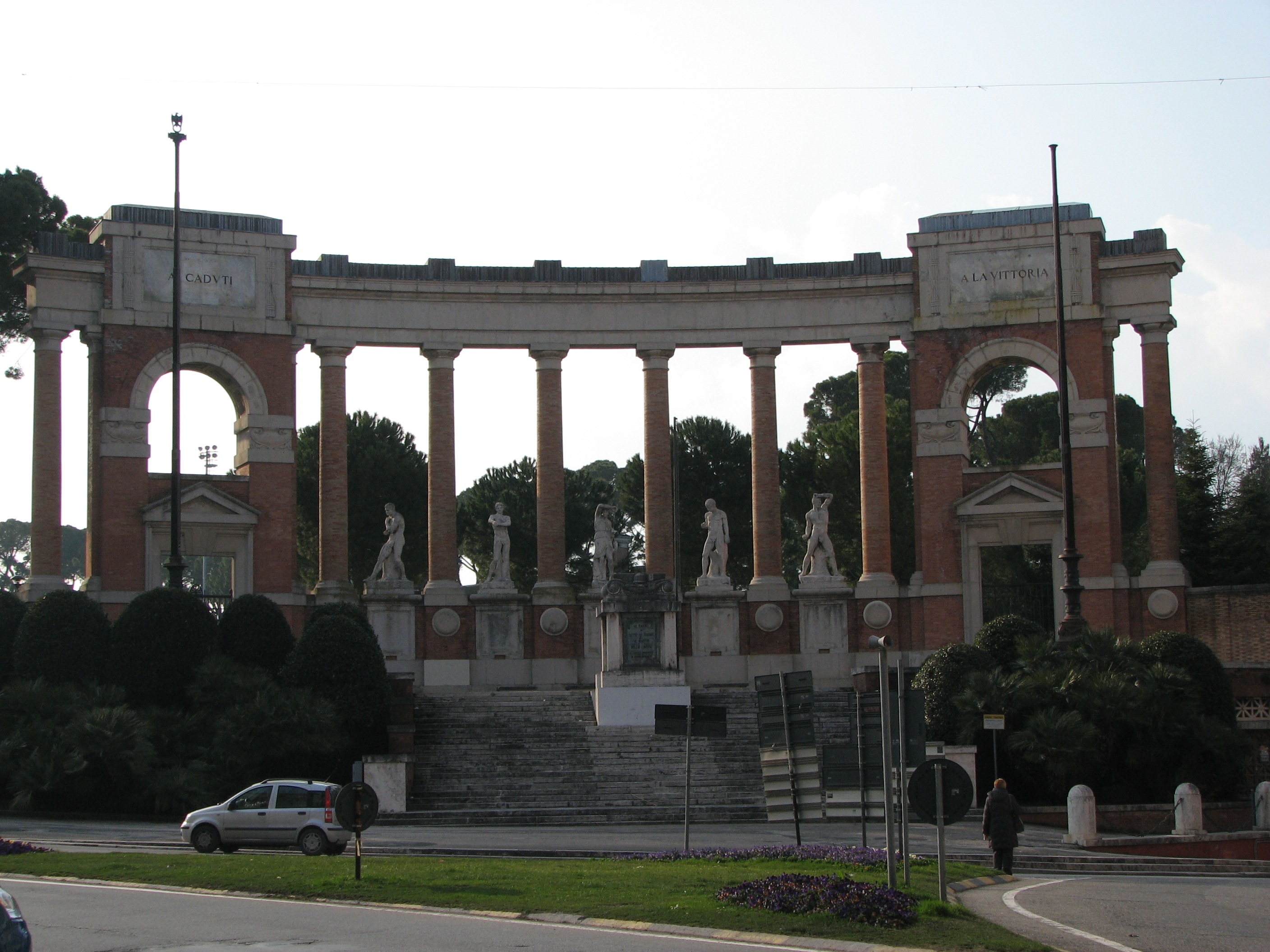
- "War Memorial of Macerata" where Traini was arrested
- Native name: Attentato di Macerata
- Location: Macerata, Marche, Italy
- Date: 3 February 2018; 11:00 (UTC+1)
- Attack type: Mass shooting, drive-by shooting
- Weapon: 9mm Glock 17 Gen 3 semi-automatic pistol
- Deaths: 0
- Injuries: 6
- Perpetrator: Luca Traini
- Motive: Racism; Xenophobia; Far-right extremism; Anti-immigration; Retaliation for the murder of Pamela Mastropietro

The 2018 Macerata shooting was a far-right terrorist shooting in Macerata, on February 3, 2018. It received extensive media coverage and affected Italian politics because it occurred during the political campaign for the 2018 general election. The perpetrator of the shooting, Luca Traini, said the attack was revenge for the murder of Pamela Mastropietro, an 18-year-old local girl whose dismembered body had been found a few days earlier, stuffed into two suitcases and dumped in the countryside. Innocent Oseghale, a 29-year-old Nigerian national and failed asylum seeker, had been arrested and charged for his involvement in Mastropietro's murder.

== Attack ==
At around 11am on Saturday 3 February 2018, in the centre of the city of Macerata, several gunshots were fired from a moving car, a black Alfa Romeo 147, injuring several people and also hitting shops and buildings. The shots were fired with a Glock 17 in front of the Macerata railway station, in via dei Velini and in via Spalato, but also in Piediripa di Macerata, Cassette Verdini, in via Pancalducci and in Borgo San Giuliano.

One of the points hit was the local headquarters of the Democratic Party. Six people were injured in the attack, all immigrants from sub-Saharan Africa aged between 20 and 32. The mayor of Macerata, Romano Carancini, issued an alert, inviting citizens to stay at home, warning of the presence of a person who was shooting in the city and informing that he had ordered the interruption of public transport services and asked schools to keep children indoors. The shooting, which was found to have been specifically aimed at foreign immigrants, was traced back to a racist origin

== Perpetrator ==
Luca Traini, then a 28-year-old man (born 21 July 1989 in Tolentino) with no criminal record, was arrested for the attack. According to the reconstruction, he left Tolentino by car and, after shooting, got out of the car in front of the city's War Memorial, where he gave the Roman salute and shouted "Long live Italy" with a flag of Italy tied around his neck, before surrendering to the police.

Items linked to the political far-right were found in his house, including a copy of Mein Kampf and a flag with a Celtic cross.

It was also ascertained that Traini had run for the Lega Nord in the 2017 municipal elections in Corridonia, where he had not received any preference; the program of the mayoral candidate for the Lega Nord also included the "control of non-EU citizens".

Initially, a news story was spread which hypothesized that Traini knew Pamela Mastropietro, an 18-year-old girl killed in Macerata a few days before, and that therefore the attack could be a revenge for the murder; this hypothesis was however denied by the young girl's family. Traini declared, however, that his initial intention was to go to court and kill Innocent Oseghale, the Nigerian drug dealer arrested on charges of having murdered Pamela Mastropietro (who was later sentenced to life imprisonment), and that he had changed his mind only later, deciding to carry out the shooting on random black people.

== Aftermath ==
Traini was a member and former local candidate of Lega Nord (LN), and many political commentators, intellectuals, and politicians criticized the LN's leader Matteo Salvini, accusing him of having spread hate and racism in the country. Anti-mafia writer Roberto Saviano labeled Salvini as the moral instigator of the attack. Salvini responded to critics by accusing the centre-left coalition government of responsibility for Mastropietro's death for allowing migrants to stay in the country and having "blood on their hands", asserting the blame lies with those who "fill us with illegal immigrants". Marco Minniti, then Italian Minister of the Interior, condemned the attack, saying that no political party must "ride the hate".

During the 2019 Christchurch mosque shootings at Al Noor Mosque and Linwood Islamic Centre in Christchurch, New Zealand, Traini's name was written on one of the weapon magazines of the perpetrator, Australian Brenton Harrison Tarrant, alongside other far-right mass murderers and killers in addition to historical figures and battles. Tarrant also named Traini as among the shooters and killers that he supported because they "take a stand against ethnic and cultural genocide". Traini dissociated himself from the event, declaring himself to be regretful about what happened in Macerata.

The Prosecutor's Office of Macerata formulated against Traini the accusation of massacre aggravated by the purpose of racism, in addition to other crimes, including unlawful carrying of firearms. On 3 October 2018, Traini was sentenced to 12 years in prison with a summary judgment.

== See also ==
- List of mass shootings in Italy
