= Immigration to Italy =

Foreign residents as a percentage of the regional population, 2011

In 2024, Istat estimated that 5,253,658 foreign citizens lived in Italy, representing about 8.9% of the total population. These figures exclude naturalized foreign-born residents (about 1,620,000 foreigners acquired Italian citizenship from 1999 to 2020, of whom 130,000 did so in 2020) as well as illegal immigrants, the so-called clandestini, whose numbers, difficult to determine, are thought to be at least 670,000.

In 2021, around 6,260,000 people residing in Italy have an immigration background (around the 10.6% of the total Italian population).

Starting from the early 1980s, Italy began to attract substantial flows of foreign immigrants. After the fall of the Berlin Wall and, more recently, the 2004 and 2007 enlargements of the European Union, large waves of migration originated from the former socialist countries of Eastern Europe (especially Romania, Albania, Ukraine, Moldova and Poland). Another source of immigration is neighbouring North Africa (in particular, Morocco, Egypt and Tunisia), with soaring arrivals as a consequence of the Arab Spring. Furthermore, in recent years, growing migration fluxes from Asia-Pacific (notably China, South Asia and the Philippines) and Latin America have been recorded.

Since the expansion of the European Union, the most recent wave of migration has been from surrounding European states, particularly Eastern Europe, replacing North Africa as the major immigration area.

Romanians made up the largest foreign community in the country (1,073,196; around 10% of them being ethnic Romani people) followed by Albanians (416,229), Moroccans (412,346) and Chinese (308,984). As of 2024, foreign citizens' origins were subdivided as follows: Europe (46.22%), Asia (23.41%), Africa (22.69%), The Americas (7.64%) and Oceania (0.04%).

The distribution of foreigners is largely uneven in Italy: in 2020, 61.2% of foreign citizens lived in northern Italy (in particular 36.1% in northwestern Italy and 25.1% in northeastern Italy), 24.2% in central Italy, 10.8% in southern Italy and 3.9% in Insular Italy.

The children born in Italy to foreign mothers were 102,000 in 2012, 99,000 in 2013 and 97,000 in 2014.

Some commentators tend to over estimate the incidence of immigration on crime in Italy, for example suggesting that immigration in Italy is a threat to security because of the higher incidence of convictions among immigrants than natives. (Note: "Da essi, infatti, si deduce che la percentuale di reati presumibilmente commessi (persone denunciate o arrestate) da stranieri irregolari (circa il 28%), è enormemente superiore al peso degli irregolari stessi (meno dell’1% della popolazione presente in Italia).") However, the most rigorous causal analysis on the effects of immigration on crime in Italy does not confirm this. Bianchi, Buonanno and Pinotti (2012) implement an instrumental variable estimation on Italian data to show that "immigration increases only the incidence of robberies, while leaving unaffected all other types of crime. Since robberies represent a very minor fraction of all criminal offenses, the effect on the overall crime rate is not significantly different from zero."

== Statistics ==
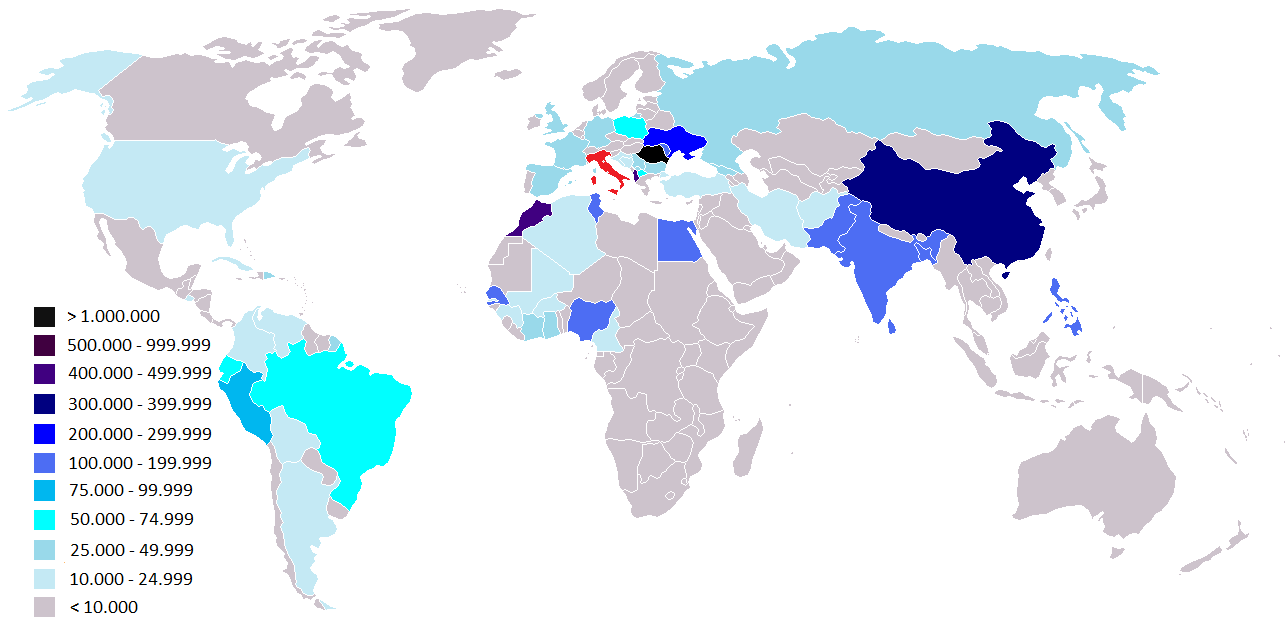
Immigrants by country of origin as of 2023. Italy is home to a large population of migrants from Eastern Europe and North Africa.

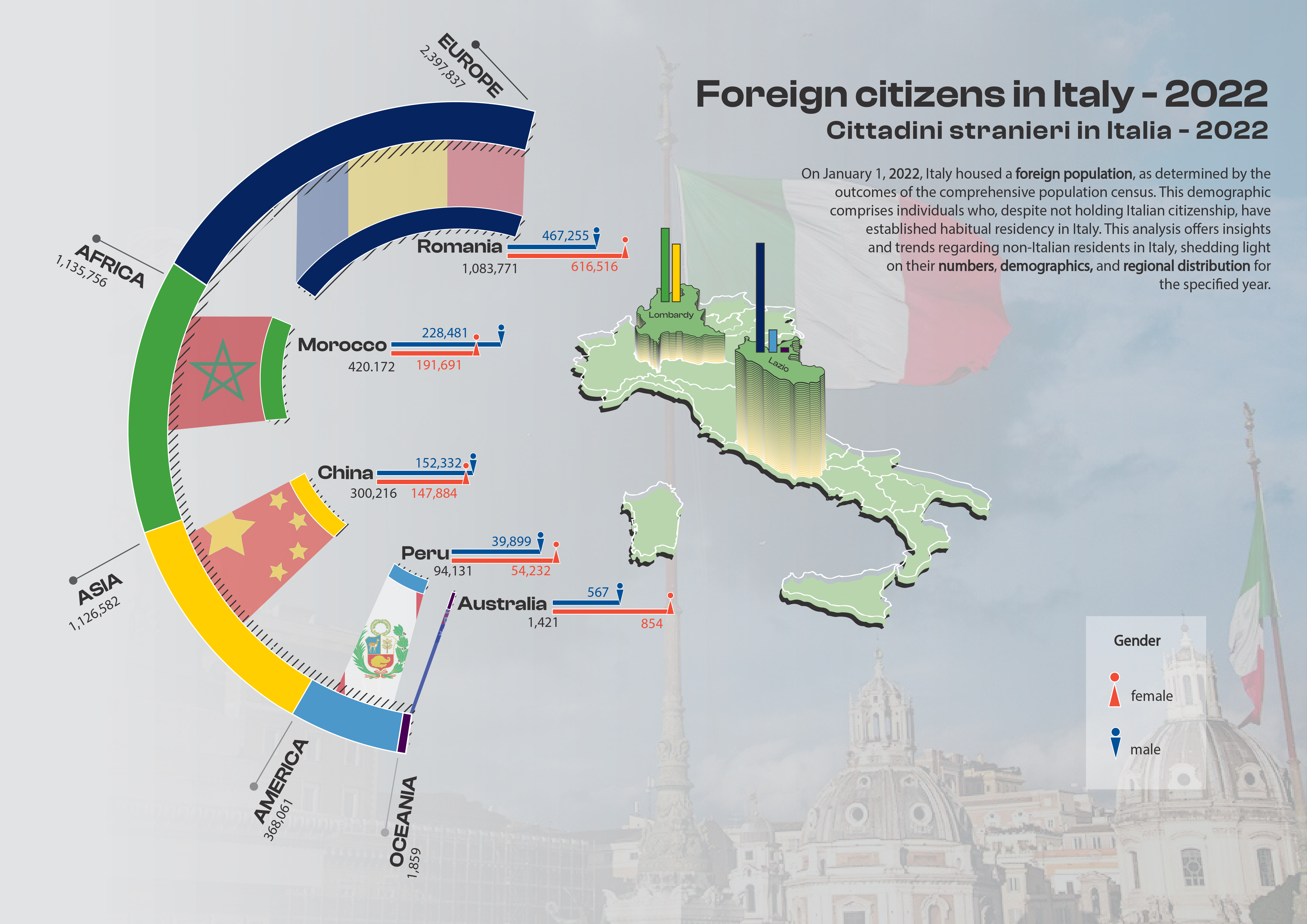
data analysis of foreign people who live in Italy since 2022

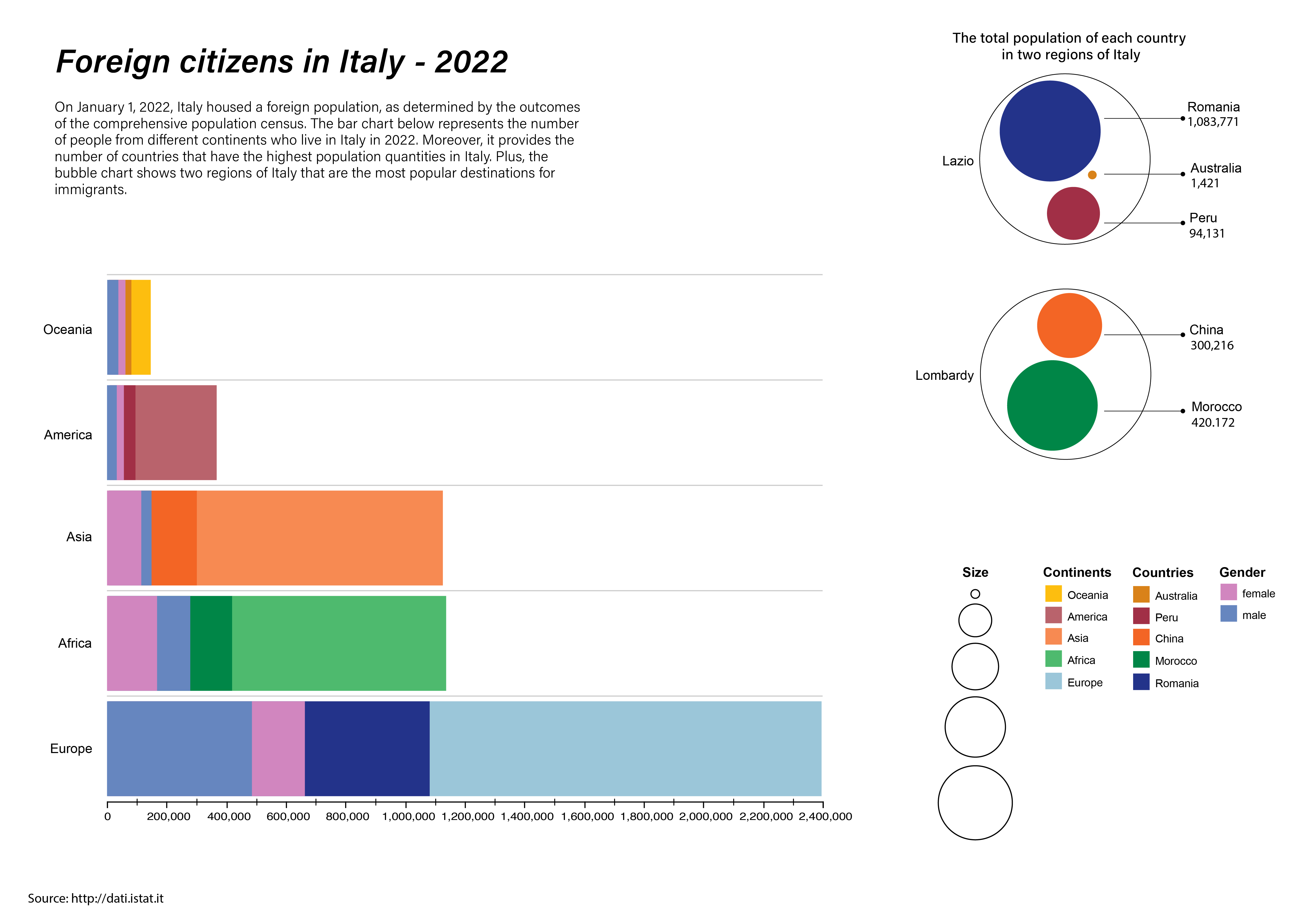
Foreign citizens in Italy, 2022

On foreigners only, for more information dealing with foreigners who have subsequently acquired Italian citizenship refer to Eurostat site.

Total foreign resident population on 1 January (Note: The figures for 2002–2011 have been revised downwards as a result of the 15th General Census of Italy which offered more precise data. The figures since 2012 are calculated adding to the foreign population enumerated by the census the foreign population inflows and outflows recorded in all Italian municipalities during each calendar year.)
| Year | Population |
|---|---|
| 2002 | 1,341,209 (2.35%) |
| 2003 | 1,549,373 (2.70%) |
| 2004 | 1,990,159 (3.45%) |
| 2005 | 2,402,157 (4.14%) |
| 2006 | 2,670,514 (4.59%) |
| 2007 | 2,938,922 (5.03%) |
| 2008 | 3,432,651 (5.84%) |
| 2009 | 3,891,295 (6.58%) |
| 2010 | 4,235,059 (7.14%) |
| 2011 | 4,570,317 (7.70%) |
| 2012 | 4,052,081 (6.81%) |
| 2013 | 4,387,721 (7.28%) |
| 2014 | 4,922,085 (8.10%) |
| 2015 | 5,014,437 (8.25%) |
| 2016 | 5,026,153 (8.28%) |
| 2017 | 5,047,028 (8.33%) |
| 2018 | 5,144,440 (8.51%) |
| 2019 | 4,996,158 (8.35%) |
| 2020 | 5,039,637 (8.45%) |
| 2021 | 5,171,894 (8.73%) |
| 2022 | 5,030,716 (8.52%) |
| 2023 | 5,141,341 (8.71%) |
| 2024 | 5,253.658 (8.9%) |
| 2025 | 5,371,251 (9.1%) |

Foreign citizens by country of origin (Note: does not include naturalized Italians and their descendants. Since 2013, the European Union foreign nationals are no longer counted in the immigration statistics. This includes Romanians, who are the largest minority group in Italy.)
| Country | 2004 | 2005 | 2006 | 2007 | 2008 | 2009 | 2010 | 2011 | 2012 | 2013 | 2014 | 2015 | 2016 | 2017 | 2018 | 2019 | 2020 | 2021 | 2022 | 2023 | Regions with significant populations |
|---|---|---|---|---|---|---|---|---|---|---|---|---|---|---|---|---|---|---|---|---|---|
| Romania | 177,812 | ▲248,849 | ▲297,570 | ▲342,200 | ▲625,278 | ▲796,477 | ▲887,763 | ▲968,576 | ▼834,465 | ▲933,354 | ▲1,081,400 | ▲1,118,776 | ▲1,151,395 | ▲1,168,552 | ▲1,190,091 | ▼1,143,859 | ▲1,145,718 | ▼1,076,412 | ▲1,083,771 | ▼1,081,836 | Lazio |
| Albania | 270,383 | ▲316,659 | ▲348,813 | ▲375,947 | ▲401,949 | ▲441,396 | ▲466,684 | ▲482,627 | ▼450,908 | ▲464,962 | ▲495,709 | ▼478,069 | ▼467,687 | ▼448,407 | ▼440,465 | ▼423,212 | ▼421,591 | ▲433,171 | ▼419,987 | ▼416,829 | Lombardy |
| Morocco | 253,362 | ▲294,945 | ▲319,537 | ▲343,228 | ▲365,908 | ▲403,592 | ▲431,529 | ▲452,424 | ▼408,667 | ▲426,791 | ▲454,773 | ▼441,104 | ▼437,485 | ▼420,651 | ▼416,531 | ▼406,112 | ▲414,249 | ▲428,947 | ▼420,172 | ▼415,088 | Lombardy |
| China | 86,738 | ▲111,712 | ▲127,822 | ▲144,885 | ▲156,519 | ▲170,265 | ▲188,352 | ▲209,934 | ▼197,064 | ▲223,367 | ▲256,846 | ▲263,659 | ▲271,330 | ▲281,972 | ▲290,681 | ▼283,430 | ▲288,923 | ▲330,495 | ▼300,216 | ▲307,038 | Trentino-Alto Adige/Südtirol |
| Ukraine | 57,971 | ▲93,441 | ▲107,118 | ▲120,070 | ▲132,718 | ▲153,998 | ▲174,129 | ▲200,730 | ▼180,121 | ▲191,725 | ▲219,050 | ▲222,039 | ▲230,728 | ▲234,354 | ▲237,047 | ▼227,867 | ▲228,560 | ▲235,953 | ▼225,307 | ▲249,613 | Campania |
| Bangladesh | 27,356 | ▲35,785 | ▲41,631 | ▲49,575 | ▲55,242 | ▲65,529 | ▲73,965 | ▲82,451 | ▼81,683 | ▲92,695 | ▲111,223 | ▲113,901 | ▲118,790 | ▲122,428 | ▲131,967 | ▼131,023 | ▲138,895 | ▲158,020 | ▲159,003 | ▲174,058 | Lombardy |
| India | 44,791 | ▲54,288 | ▲61,847 | ▲69,504 | ▲77,432 | ▲91,855 | ▲105,863 | ▲121,036 | ▼118,409 | ▲128,903 | ▲142,453 | ▲145,879 | ▲150,456 | ▲151,430 | ▲151,791 | ▼147,153 | ▲153,209 | ▲165,512 | ▼162,492 | ▲167,333 | Lombardy |
| Philippines | 72,372 | ▲82,625 | ▲89,668 | ▲101,337 | ▲105,675 | ▼113,686 | ▲123,584 | ▲134,154 | ▼129,188 | ▲139,835 | ▲162,655 | ▲167,834 | ▼165,900 | ▲166,459 | ▲167,859 | ▼158,049 | ▼157,665 | ▲165,443 | ▼158,997 | ▼158,926 | Lombardy |
| Egypt | 40,583 | ▲52,865 | ▲58,879 | ▲65,667 | ▲69,572 | ▲74,599 | ▲82,064 | ▲90,365 | ▼66,932 | ▲76,691 | ▲96,008 | ▲103,471 | ▲109,871 | ▲112,765 | ▲119,513 | ▲119,864 | ▲128,095 | ▲139,569 | ▲140,322 | ▲147,797 | Lombardy |
| Pakistan | 27,798 | ▲35,509 | ▲41,797 | ▲46,085 | ▲49,344 | ▲55,371 | ▲64,859 | ▲75,720 | ▼71,031 | ▲80,658 | ▲90,615 | ▼90,336 | ▲101,784 | ▲108,204 | ▲114,198 | ▲116,631 | ▲121,609 | ▲135,520 | ▼134,182 | ▲144,129 | Lombardy |
| Nigeria | 26,383 | ▲31,647 | ▲34,310 | ▲37,733 | ▲40,641 | ▲44,544 | ▲48,674 | ▲53,613 | ▼48,220 | ▲56,476 | ▲66,833 | ▲70,775 | ▲77,264 | ▲88,533 | ▲106,069 | ▲114,096 | ▼113,049 | ▲119,089 | ▲119,435 | ▲123,646 | Veneto |
| Senegal | 46,478 | ▲53,941 | ▲57,101 | ▲59,857 | ▲62,620 | ▲67,510 | ▲72,618 | ▲80,989 | ▼73,702 | ▲80,325 | ▲90,863 | ▲93,352 | ▲98,176 | ▲101,207 | ▲105,937 | ▼105,227 | ▲106,198 | ▲111,092 | ▼110,763 | ▲112,598 | Lombardy |
| Sri Lanka | 39,231 | ▲45,572 | ▲50,528 | ▲56,745 | ▲61,064 | ▼68,738 | ▲75,343 | ▲81,094 | ▲71,573 | ▲79,530 | ▲95,007 | ▲100,368 | ▲102,316 | ▲104,908 | ▲107,967 | ▼104,763 | ▲107,598 | ▲112,018 | ▼108,069 | ▲109,828 | Veneto |
| Moldova | 24,645 | ▲37,971 | ▲47,632 | ▲55,803 | ▲68,591 | ▲89,424 | ▲105,600 | ▲130,948 | ▲132,175 | ▲139,734 | ▲149,434 | ▼143,442 | ▼142,266 | ▼135,661 | ▼131,814 | ▼122,762 | ▼118,516 | ▲122,667 | ▼114,914 | ▼109,804 | Emilia Romagna |
| Tunisia | 68,630 | ▲78,230 | ▲83,564 | ▲88,932 | ▲93,601 | ▲100,112 | ▲103,678 | ▲106,291 | ▼82,997 | ▲88,291 | ▲97,317 | ▼93,795 | ▲95,645 | ▼94,064 | ▼93,795 | ▼90,615 | ▲93,350 | ▲97,407 | ▲99,002 | ▲102,422 | Lazio |
| Peru | 43,009 | ▲53,378 | ▲59,269 | ▲66,506 | ▲70,755 | ▲77,629 | ▲87,747 | ▲98,603 | ▼93,841 | ▲99,173 | ▲109,851 | ▼108,465 | ▼98,176 | ▲99,110 | ▼97,379 | ▼91,859 | ▼91,662 | ▲96,546 | ▼94,131 | ▲98,733 | Lazio |
| Poland | 40,314 | ▲50,974 | ▲60,823 | ▲72,457 | ▲90,218 | ▲99,389 | ▲106,608 | ▲109,018 | ▼84,749 | ▲88,839 | ▲97,566 | ▼96,285 | ▲97,986 | ▼97,062 | ▼95,727 | ▼88,803 | ▼86,743 | ▼77,779 | ▼74,981 | ▼74,387 | Lazio |
| Ecuador | 33,506 | ▲53,220 | ▲61,953 | ▲68,880 | ▲73,235 | ▲80,070 | ▲85,940 | ▲91,625 | ▼80,333 | ▲82,791 | ▲91,861 | ▼90,680 | ▼87,427 | ▼83,120 | ▼80,377 | ▼74,661 | ▼72,644 | ▼72,193 | ▼66,590 | ▼63,211 | Lombardy |
| Brazil | 22,533 | ▲25,823 | ▲30,375 | ▲34,342 | ▲37,848 | ▲41,476 | ▲44,067 | ▲46,690 | ▼37,567 | ▲39,157 | ▲43,202 | ▼41,972 | ▲43,783 | ▲45,410 | ▲48,022 | ▲49,445 | ▲51,790 | ▼50,666 | ▼47,318 | ▲51,125 | Lombardy |
| North Macedonia | 51,208 | ▲58,460 | ▲63,245 | ▲74,162 | ▲78,090 | ▲89,066 | ▲92,847 | ▼89,900 | ▼73,972 | ▲76,608 | ▲78,424 | ▼72,175 | ▲73,512 | ▼67,969 | ▼65,347 | ▼60,581 | ▼55,816 | ▼55,771 | ▼53,443 | ▼51,090 | Tuscany |
| Bulgaria | 11,467 | ▲15,374 | ▲17,746 | ▲19,924 | ▲33,477 | ▲40,880 | ▲46,026 | ▲51,134 | ▼42,000 | ▲47,872 | ▲54,932 | ▲55,759 | ▲58,001 | ▲58,620 | ▲59,254 | ▼56,593 | ▲56,645 | ▼50,355 | ▼49,205 | ▲49,518 | Lombardy |
| Ghana | 29,252 | ▲32,754 | ▲34,499 | ▲36,540 | ▲38,400 | ▲42,327 | ▲44,353 | ▲46,890 | ▼44,364 | ▲48,575 | ▲51,602 | ▼49,961 | ▼48,637 | ▼48,138 | ▲49,940 | ▼49,797 | ▼49,543 | ▲50,778 | ▼48,280 | ▼47,335 | Emilia Romagna |
| Russia | 14,311 | ▲17,188 | ▲18,689 | ▲20,459 | ▲21,523 | ▲23,201 | ▲25,786 | ▲30,504 | ▼28,604 | ▲30,948 | ▲34,483 | ▲34,702 | ▲35,791 | ▲36,361 | ▲37,384 | ▼36,512 | ▲37,424 | ▲39,746 | ▼36,982 | ▲39,705 | Lombardy |
| Kosovo | | | | | | 7,625 | ▲16,234 | ▲22,778 | ▲40,475 | ▲43,751 | ▲46,248 | ▼42,550 | ▲43,091 | ▼41,344 | ▼40,371 | ▼39,630 | ▼38,645 | ▲38,860 | ▼37,064 | ▼36,372 | |
| Germany | 34,664 | ▲35,559 | ▲36,834 | ▲38,135 | ▲40,163 | ▲41,476 | ▲42,302 | ▲42,531 | ▼34,936 | ▲35,576 | ▲38,136 | ▼31,776 | ▲36,661 | ▼36,660 | ▲36,806 | ▼35,442 | ▼35,316 | ▼35,091 | ▼32,984 | ▲34,003 | Lombardy |
| Serbia | | | | | | 57,826 | ▼53,875 | ▼52,954 | ▼43,022 | ▲43,816 | ▲46,958 | ▼41,708 | ▲42,264 | ▼39,937 | ▼39,690 | ▼35,578 | ▼33,322 | ▼32,898 | ▼31,342 | ▼30,835 | Lombardy |
| France | 26,428 | ▲26,951 | ▲28,021 | ▲29,205 | ▲30,803 | ▲32,079 | ▲32,956 | ▲33,400 | ▼23,985 | ▲25,016 | ▲29,078 | ▼27,436 | ▲28,634 | ▲29,281 | ▲29,991 | ▼29,008 | ▲29,721 | ▲31,354 | ▼28,735 | ▲29,942 | Lombardy |
| Dominican Republic | 13,904 | ▲15,286 | ▲16,725 | ▲17,892 | ▲18,591 | ▲20,583 | ▲22,920 | ▲24,529 | ▼23,020 | ▲25,405 | ▲28,623 | ▼28,277 | ▼28,202 | ▼28,002 | ▲28,451 | ▼28,208 | ▲29,111 | ▲30,255 | ▼28,812 | ▲29,571 | Lombardy |
| Georgia | 447 | ▲569 | ▲675 | ▲811 | ▲1,012 | ▲1,482 | ▲2,734 | ▲6,520 | ▲7,083 | ▲9,123 | ▲12,124 | ▲13,688 | ▲14,045 | ▲14,603 | ▲15,203 | ▼15,021 | ▲15,667 | ▲18,272 | ▲22,907 | ▲29,222 | Tuscany |
| Ivory Coast | 11,435 | ▲13,228 | ▲14,378 | ▲15,637 | ▲17,132 | ▲19,408 | ▲21,222 | ▲22,665 | ▼20,878 | ▲23,563 | ▲25,953 | ▼25,174 | ▼25,056 | ▲26,159 | ▲30,271 | ▲31,001 | ▼30,038 | ▼29,673 | ▼28,385 | ▲28,559 | Lombardy |
| Spain | 14,019 | ▲14,837 | ▲15,503 | ▲16,292 | ▲17,354 | ▲18,258 | ▲19,094 | ▲19,887 | ▼15,129 | ▲17,021 | ▲20,682 | ▲21,001 | ▲22,593 | ▲23,828 | ▲24,870 | ▲24,936 | ▲25,954 | ▲32,637 | ▼26,417 | ▲27,854 | Lombardy |
| United Kingdom | 20,972 | ▲22,318 | ▲23,324 | ▲24,673 | ▲26,448 | ▼28,174 | ▲29,184 | ▲29,560 | ▼22,839 | ▲23,744 | ▲26,377 | ▼25,523 | ▲26,634 | ▲27,208 | ▲28,168 | ▼27,857 | ▲29,654 | ▲30,325 | ▼28,355 | ▼27,758 | Lombardy |
| Cuba | 10,149 | ▲11,363 | ▲12,927 | ▲14,073 | ▲14,581 | ▲15,883 | ▲16,878 | ▲17,947 | ▼16,350 | ▲17,538 | ▲19,316 | ▲19,560 | ▲20,662 | ▲20,986 | ▲21,418 | ▼21,417 | ▲22,311 | ▲22,958 | ▼21,499 | ▲23,531 | Lombardy |
| El Salvador | 4,240 | ▲5,085 | ▲5,509 | ▲5,895 | ▲6,144 | ▲6,552 | ▲7,213 | ▲8,739 | ▲9,235 | ▲10,443 | ▲11,809 | ▲12,973 | ▲13,007 | ▲13,492 | ▲14,626 | ▲15,437 | ▲16,270 | ▲20,038 | ▲20,608 | ▲22,693 | Lombardy |
| Gambia | 541 | ▲628 | ▲650 | ▲676 | ▲748 | ▲825 | ▲912 | ▲1,033 | ▼941 | ▲1,244 | ▲1,630 | ▲3,271 | ▲8,016 | ▲13,780 | ▲19,567 | ▲22,075 | ▼21,336 | ▲22,213 | ▼21,826 | ▲22,637 | Sicily |
| Mali | 547 | ▲642 | ▲702 | ▲735 | ▲832 | ▲992 | ▲1,090 | ▲1,263 | ▼1,252 | ▲2,946 | ▲4,470 | ▲6,098 | ▲10,369 | ▲14,768 | ▲19,134 | ▲20,078 | ▼19,350 | ▲20,015 | ▼20,008 | ▲21,032 | Campania |
| Colombia | 13,989 | ▲15,843 | ▲16,810 | ▲17,640 | ▲17,890 | ▲18,615 | ▲19,573 | ▲20,571 | ▼17,086 | ▲17,880 | ▲19,661 | ▼18,956 | ▼18,777 | ▼17,968 | ▼17,956 | ▼17,539 | ▲18,053 | ▲19,848 | ▼19,025 | ▲20,856 | Lombardy |
| Bosnia and Herzegovina | 20,152 | ▲22,436 | ▲24,142 | ▲26,298 | ▲27,356 | ▲30,124 | ▲31,341 | ▲31,972 | ▼28,015 | ▲28,996 | ▲29,831 | ▼28,120 | ▼27,199 | ▼25,791 | ▼25,034 | ▼22,944 | ▼21,911 | ▼21,442 | ▼21,234 | ▼20,454 | Veneto |
| Turkey | 9,130 | ▲11,077 | ▲12,359 | ▲13,532 | ▲14,562 | ▲16,225 | ▲17,651 | ▲19,068 | ▼16,354 | ▲17,711 | ▲19,951 | ▼19,450 | ▼19,388 | ▼19,217 | ▲19,509 | ▼18,780 | ▲19,168 | ▲20,999 | ▼18,930 | ▲20,080 | Lombardy |
| Algeria | 15,493 | ▲18,736 | ▲20,202 | ▲21,519 | ▲22,672 | ▲24,387 | ▲25,449 | ▲25,935 | ▼20,725 | ▲21,801 | ▲23,095 | ▼21,899 | ▼21,765 | ▼20,437 | ▼19,823 | ▼18,507 | ▼18,468 | ▲18,538 | ▼17,998 | ▲18,095 | Campania |
| Afghanistan | 172 | ▲198 | ▲312 | ▲442 | ▲1,063 | ▲2,198 | ▲3,372 | ▲3,811 | ▼3,512 | ▲4,813 | ▲6,635 | ▲7,330 | ▲8,574 | ▲11,224 | ▲11,738 | ▼10,600 | ▲11,121 | ▲12,199 | ▲13,547 | ▲16,872 | Lazio |
| Iran | 6,405 | ▲6,550 | ▲6,566 | ▲6,850 | ▲6,913 | ▲6,983 | ▲7,106 | ▲7,444 | ▼5,962 | ▲7,273 | ▲8,995 | ▲9,540 | ▲10,304 | ▲10,794 | ▲11,565 | ▲11,837 | ▲12,866 | ▲14,255 | ▼14,009 | ▲16,490 | Lombardy |
| United States of America | 14,132 | ▲14,155 | ▲14,433 | ▲14,904 | ▲15,036 | ▲15,324 | ▲15,708 | ▼15,620 | ▼12,184 | ▲13,165 | ▲14,963 | ▼14,145 | ▲14,512 | ▲14,649 | ▲15,004 | ▼14,966 | ▲15,393 | ▲18,837 | ▼14,496 | ▲15,582 | Lazio |
| Croatia | 19,890 | ▲20,712 | ▲21,232 | ▲21,360 | ▼21,308 | ▲21,511 | ▼21,261 | ▼21,079 | ▼16,708 | ▲17,051 | ▲17,999 | ▼17,375 | ▲18,052 | ▼17,698 | ▼17,573 | ▼16,591 | ▼16,285 | ▲17,362 | ▼15,754 | ▼15,514 | Lombardy |
| Cameroon | 3,682 | ▲4,672 | ▲5,529 | ▲6,249 | ▲6,940 | ▲7,994 | ▲9,175 | ▲10,324 | ▼8,830 | ▲10,071 | ▲11,880 | ▲12,298 | ▲12,738 | ▲13,308 | ▲14,529 | ▲15,170 | ▲15,329 | ▲15,581 | ▼15,013 | ▲15,443 | Emilia Romagna |
| Argentina | 13,174 | ▲13,720 | ▲13,907 | ▼13,422 | ▼12,492 | ▼11,842 | ▼11,338 | ▼11,239 | ▼7,896 | ▲8,025 | ▲8,642 | ▼8,179 | ▲8,270 | ▼8,009 | ▲8,023 | ▲8,169 | ▲9,117 | ▼9,091 | ▲10,522 | ▲14,662 | Lombardy |
| Burkina Faso | 5,545 | ▲7,012 | ▲7,949 | ▲8,543 | ▲8,960 | ▲10,493 | ▲11,784 | ▲13,051 | ▼12,752 | ▲14,007 | ▲15,301 | ▼14,797 | ▼14,657 | ▼14,306 | ▲14,435 | ▼14,051 | ▼13,979 | ▲14,236 | ▼14,167 | ▲14,204 | Lombardy |
| Venezuela | 4,245 | ▲4,579 | ▲4,913 | ▲5,114 | ▲5,219 | ▲5,339 | ▲5,580 | ▲5,808 | ▼4,787 | ▲5,138 | ▲5,506 | ▲5,594 | ▲5,849 | ▲6,327 | ▲7,347 | ▲8,981 | ▲10,316 | ▲12,135 | ▼12,033 | ▲13,548 | Lombardy |
| Bolivia | 2,508 | ▲3,637 | ▲4,127 | ▲4,800 | ▲6,043 | ▲6,796 | ▲8,855 | ▲12,268 | ▼11,774 | ▲12,357 | ▲13,919 | ▲14,384 | ▼14,243 | ▼14,076 | ▼13,955 | ▼13,277 | ▼13,141 | ▲13,271 | ▼12,924 | ▲12,930 | Lombardy |
| Guinea | 1,259 | ▲1,604 | ▲1,813 | ▲2,014 | ▲2,268 | ▲2,679 | ▲2,991 | ▲3,360 | ▼3,297 | ▲3,896 | ▲4,371 | ▲4,425 | ▲4,928 | ▲6,897 | ▲11,240 | ▲12,728 | ▼12,213 | ▲12,255 | ▼11,796 | ▲11,880 | Lombardy |
| Somalia | 5,963 | ▲6,094 | ▲6,249 | ▲6,414 | ▼6,237 | ▲6,663 | ▲7,728 | ▲8,112 | ▼4,586 | ▲5,235 | ▲6,878 | ▲7,677 | ▲7,903 | ▲8,228 | ▲9,102 | ▼8,626 | ▼8,515 | ▼7,629 | ▲8,370 | ▲9,349 | Lazio |
| Belarus | 2,095 | ▲2,791 | ▲3,258 | ▲3,767 | ▲4,265 | ▲5,062 | ▲5,952 | ▲6,975 | ▼6,654 | ▲7,446 | ▲8,177 | ▲8,195 | ▲8,529 | ▲8,636 | ▲8,885 | ▼8,704 | ▲8,808 | ▲9,269 | ▼8,811 | ▲9,248 | Lombardy |
| Netherlands | 6,787 | ▲6,989 | ▲7,356 | ▲7,752 | ▲8,165 | ▲8,521 | ▲8,651 | ▲8,695 | ▼7,163 | ▲7,378 | ▲7,856 | ▼7,616 | ▲8,106 | ▲8,243 | ▲8,344 | ▼8,184 | ▲8,283 | ▲10,092 | ▼8,367 | ▲8,820 | Lombardy |
| Eritrea | 4,900 | ▲5,634 | ▲7,090 | ▲8,972 | ▲11,386 | ▲11,911 | ▲12,967 | ▲13,368 | ▼8,074 | ▲8,752 | ▲11,187 | ▼10,570 | ▼9,597 | ▼9,394 | ▼9,343 | ▼8,141 | ▼8,035 | ▼6,912 | ▼6,575 | ▼6,404 | |
| Rest of Europe | 118,159 | 119,870 | 128,299 | 132,310 | 143,602 | 80,381 | 86,342 | 87,261 | 69,066 | 74,661 | 81,868 | 73,734 | | 63,622 | 62,334 | | 66,817 | | 81,254 | 84,149 | |
| Rest of North Africa and Western/Central Asia | 15,540 | 16,719 | 17,543 | 18,565 | 19,366 | 20,449 | 21,572 | 22,786 | 16,812 | 18,976 | 22,772 | 22,756 | | 44,526 | 47,513 | | | | 31,296 | 34,572 | |
| Rest of South Asia | 266 | 329 | 426 | 466 | 514 | 608 | 701 | 860 | 787 | 928 | 1,189 | 1,258 | | 1,516 | 1,630 | | | | 1,729 | 1,816 | |
| Rest of East and South-East Asia | 15,354 | 16,703 | 17,501 | 18,666 | 19,358 | 20,367 | 21,382 | 22,218 | 17,067 | 18,842 | 22,267 | 20,939 | | 22,895 | 19,877 | | | | 22,777 | 23,840 | |
| Rest of Sub-Saharan Africa | 34,102 | 37,591 | 41,013 | 45,630 | 48,563 | 51,619 | 54,091 | 55,272 | 43,548 | 48,293 | 54,281 | 52,842 | | 52,591 | 54,501 | | 59,385 | | 51,002 | 52,056 | |
| Rest of Americas | 13,066 | 13,954 | 14,713 | 15,492 | 15,716 | 16,567 | 17,324 | 18,746 | 14,517 | 16,023 | 18,317 | 17,643 | | 18,406 | 20,796 | | | | 20,103 | 21,785 | |
| Europe | 904,490 (1.57%) | 1,111,199 (1.92%) | 1,249,605 (2.15%) | 1,380,974 (2.36%) | 1,771,308 (3.01%) | 2,067,868 (3.50%) | 2,251,635 (3.80%) | 2,422,399 (4.08%) | 2,134,986 (3.59%) | 2,298,498 (3.82%) | 2,564,208 (4.22%) | 2,546,281 (4.19%) | 2,601,313 | 2,588,451 (4.28%) | 2,600,748 (4.31%) | | 2,609,690 (4.33%) | | 2,378,907 (4.03%) | 2,397,731 (4.06%) | |
| North Africa and Western/Central Asia | 409,762 (0.71%) | 479,691 (0.83%) | 519,325 (0.89%) | 559,104 (0.96%) | 593,606 (1.01%) | 647,829 (1.10%) | 691,783 (1.17%) | 730,833 (1.23%) | 625,532 (1.05%) | 666,657 (1.11%) | 735,035 (1.21%) | 725,703 (1.19%) | 741,090 | 729,064 (1.21%) | 735,681 (1.22%) | | | | 764,636 (1.30%) | 783,766 (1.33%) | |
| South Asia | 139,614 (0.24%) | 171,681 (0.30%) | 196,541 (0.34%) | 222,817 (0.38%) | 244,659 (0.42%) | 284,299 (0.48%) | 324,103 (0.55%) | 364,972 (0.61%) | 346,995 (0.58%) | 387,527 (0.64%) | 447,122 (0.74%) | 459,072 (0.76%) | 474,736 | 488,486 (0.81%) | 507,553 (0.84%) | | | | 579,022 (0.98%) | 614,036 (1.04%) | |
| East and South-East Asia | 174,464 (0.30%) | 211,040 (0.36%) | 234,991 (0.40%) | 264,888 (0.45%) | 281,552 (0.48%) | 304,318 (0.51%) | 333,318 (0.56%) | 366,306 (0.62%) | 343,319 (0.58%) | 382,044 (0.63%) | 441,768 (0.73%) | 452,432 (0.74%) | 459,572 | 471,326 (0.78%) | 478,417 (0.79%) | | | | 481,990 (0.82%) | 489,804 (0.83%) | |
| Sub-Saharan Africa | 170,267 (0.30%) | 195,447 (0.34%) | 211,283 (0.36%) | 229,000 (0.39%) | 244,727 (0.42%) | 266,965 (0.45%) | 287,605 (0.49%) | 309,940 (0.52%) | 270,444 (0.45%) | 303,383 (0.50%) | 345,249 (0.57%) | 351,240 (0.58%) | 369,567 | 397,309 (0.66%) | 444,058 (0.74%) | | | | 455,620 (0.77%) | 465,143 (0.79%) | |
| Americas | 188,455 (0.33%) | 230,043 (0.40%) | 255,661 (0.44%) | 278,960 (0.48%) | 293,550 (0.50%) | 316,676 (0.54%) | 343,143 (0.58%) | 372,385 (0.63%) | 328,590 (0.55%) | 347,095 (0.58%) | 385,670 (0.63%) | 380,828 (0.63%) | 376,556 | 369,555 (0.61%) | 373,354 (0.62%) | | | | 368,061 (0.62%) | 388,227 (0.66%) | |
| Oceania | 2,562 (<0.01%) | 2,460 (<0.01%) | 2,486 (<0.01%) | 2,536 (<0.01%) | 2,527 (<0.01%) | 2,547 (<0.01%) | 2,618 (<0.01%) | 2,642 (<0.01%) | 1,821 (<0.01%) | 1,921 (<0.01%) | 2,220 (<0.01%) | 2,015 (<0.01%) | 2,104 (<0.01%) | 2,122 (<0,01%) | 2,170 (<0.01%) | 2,120 (<0.01%) | 2,213 (<0.01%) | 2,256 (<0.01%) | 1,859 (<0.01%) | 1,991 (<0.01%) | |
| Total foreigners | 1,990,159 (3.45%) | 2,402,157 (4.14%) | 2,670,514 (4.59%) | 2,938,922 (5.03%) | 3,432,651 (5.84%) | 3,891,295 (6.58%) | 4,235,059 (7.14%) | 4,570,317 (7.70%) | 4,052,081 (6.81%) | 4,387,721 (7.28%) | 4,922,085 (8.10%) | 5,014,437 (8.25%) | 5,026,153 (8.28%) | 5,047,028 (8.33%) | 5,144,440 (8.51%) | 4,996,158 (8.35%) | 5,039,637 (8.45%) | 5,171,894 (8.73%) | 5,030,716 (8.52%) | 5,141,341 (8.71%) | |
| Italians | 55,694,841 (96.55%) | 55,566,843 (95.86%) | 55,473,486 (95.41%) | 55,499,078 (94.97%) | 55,394,349 (94.16%) | 55,203,705 (93.42%) | 55,041,941 (92.86%) | 54,808,683 (92.30%) | 55,487,919 (93.19%) | 55,846,279 (92.72%) | 55,866,915 (91.90%) | 55,781,563 (91.75%) | 55,639,847 (91.72%) | 55,531,972 (91.67%) | 55,339,560 (91.50%) | 54,820,515 (91.65%) | 54,601,851 (91.55%) | 54,064,319 (91.27%) | 53,999,417 (91.48%) | 53,855,860 (91.26%) | |
| Italy | 57,685,000 | 57,969,000 | 58,144,000 | 58,438,000 | 58,827,000 | 59,095,000 | 59,277,000 | 59,379,000 | 59,540,000 | 60,234,000 | 60,789,000 | 60,796,000 | 60,666,000 | 60,579,000 | 60,484,000 | 59,816,673 | 59,641,488 | 59,236,213 | 59,030,133 | 58,997,201 | |

- Turkey has been counted as an Asian country
- Sudan and Mauritania have been counted in Sub-Saharan Africa
- Afghanistan has been counted in South Asia

== Public opinion ==
In 2018, a poll by Pew Research found that a majority (71%) wanted fewer immigrants to be allowed into the country, 18% wanted to keep the current level and 5% wanted to increase immigration.

A 2019 poll by YouGov showed that 53% thought authorities should not accept more refugees from conflict areas, 25% were in favour of more refugees and 19% were undecided.

According to poll published by Corriere della Sera in 2019, one of two respondents (51%) approved closing Italy's ports to further boat migrants arriving via the Mediterranean, while 19% welcomed further boat migrants.

In 2021, 77% of Italians thought the current immigrant influx was too high, as underlined by a poll published by La Repubblica and carried out by YouGov.

== Labour migration ==
The Meloni government authorised more than 450,000 entries for non-EU workers between 2023 and 2025. In July 2025, the government approved plans to authorise 497,550 entries for non-EU workers for the 2026–2028 period, including 164,850 in 2026. The quotas included allocations for workers from specified non-EU countries, particularly in Asia, Africa, and Eastern Europe.

== Mediterranean Sea crossings crisis ==
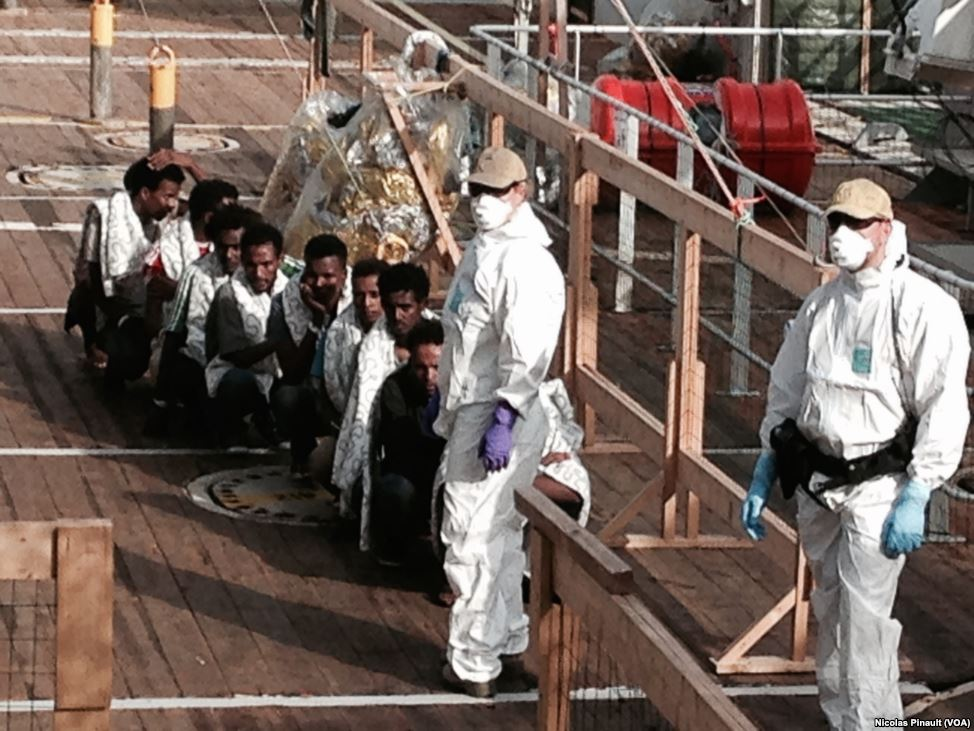
Asylum seekers arrive in Sicily, 2015. The Arab Spring and the Syrian War created factors that led to a migrant crisis that saw hundred of thousands of boat-dwellers seeking refuge in Italy and other Mediterranean countries.

Due to the peninsula geographical position and close proximity to the North Africa coast, the crossing of the Mediterranean Sea has historically been the most used route for undocumented migrants. This route has become gradually more prominent, as flow through other routes to the EU gradually faded and political turmoil in Libya caused a general weakening of borders and coastal control, opening opportunities to people smuggling organisations.

The principal destination for sea crossings boats and rafts are the southernmost Italian territories, the Pelagian Islands. These islands are 113 km from Tunisia, 167 from Libya and 207 from Sicily.

The close distance between these islands and the African mainland has caused people smuggling organisations to employ boats and rafts otherwise hardly seaworthy, generally vastly filled above their capacity. Official reports list boats filled up to 2 or 3 times nominal capacity, including the use of rubber dinghies. This has led to several accidents at sea, as in 2007, the 2009, the 2011, the 2013, 2015. These accidents have become harder to document between 2014 and 2017, as people smuggling organisations changed their tactics: instead of aiming for a full crossing of the sea towards Lampedusa, their boats aimed just to exit Libyan territorial waters and then trigger rescue operation from passing mercantile vessels, seek and rescue organisations, Italian and Maltese coastguards and militaries. As per the United Nations Convention of the Sea, of which Italy is a subscriber, people rescued at sea have to be transported to the closest safe harbor: as Libya continues to be in political turmoil this means they are transported to Italy.

Once in Italy, the EU Dublin Regulation requires migrants to apply for legal residence, protection or asylum permits in the first EU country they cross into, effectively barring them from legally crossing internal EU borders until their case has been processed and positively concluded. As the vast majority of migrant people landing in Italy targets destinations in Central and Northern European States, there is a tendency to avoid filing permits applications in Italy and rather try a northwards land journey.

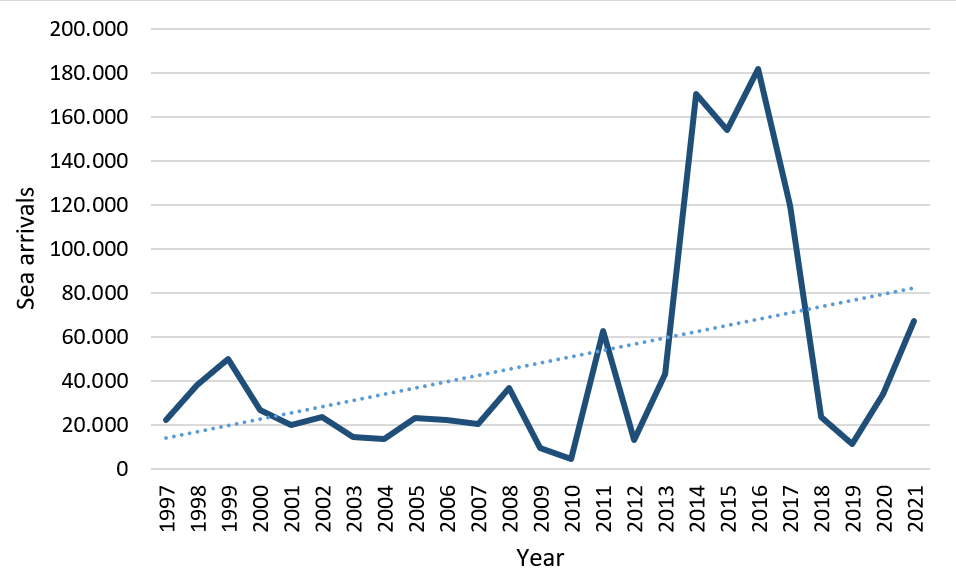
Refugees and migrants arriving in Italy by sea, 1997–2021

As a reaction to the gradual increase in migration flows through the Mediterranean Sea, Italian governments stepped up cooperation with Tunisian and Libyan authorities to halt activities of people smuggling organisation on land, as well as to allow boats rescued from the Italian Military in international waters to be towed back to the port where they left from. This policy, enacted in 2004 and 2005, sparked controversies related in particular to the compatibility with Italian and EU laws, as numerous reports documented acts of violence from Libyan authorities on migrant people. The policy was openly criticised by the EU Parliament.

In 2008, Berlusconi's government in Italy and Gaddafi's government in Libya signed a treaty including cooperation between the two countries in stopping unlawful migration from Libya to Italy; this led to a policy of forcibly returning to Libya boat migrants intercepted by the Italian coast guard at sea. The cooperation collapsed following the outbreak of the Libyan civil war in 2011. In 2012 the European Court of Human Rights ruled that Italy had violated the European Convention on Human Rights by returning migrants to Libya, as it exposed the migrants to the risk of being subjected to ill-treatment in Libya and violated the prohibition of collective expulsions, thus effectively ending the policy.

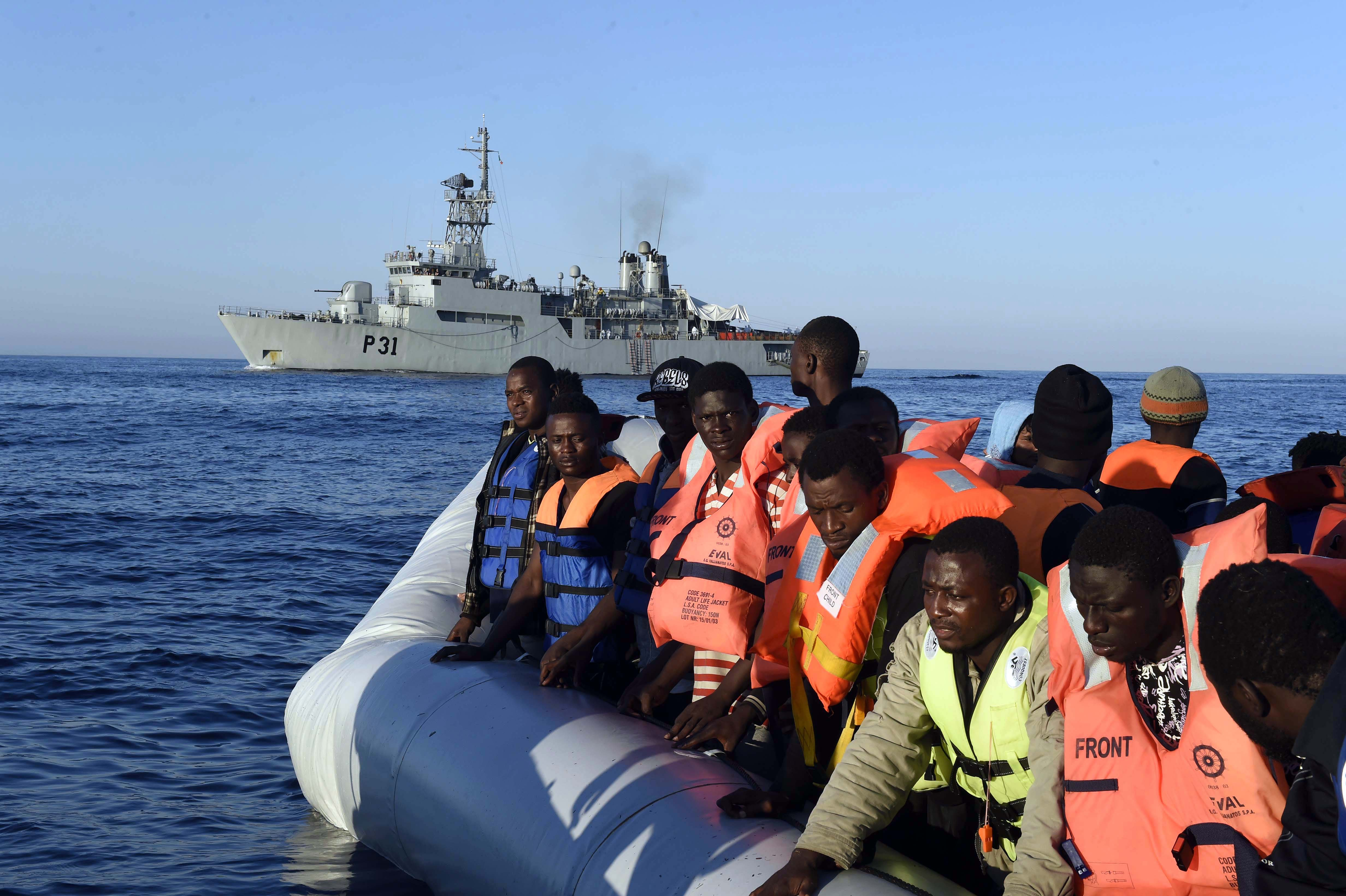
Rescued male migrants are brought to southern Italian ports, 28 June 2015.

In 2009, as the flow of migrants picked up again, the overcrowded conditions at the Pelagian Islands' temporary immigrant reception centre came under criticism by the United Nations High Commissioner for Refugees (UNHCR). The unit, which was originally built for a maximum capacity of 850 people, was reported to be housing nearly 2,000 boat people. A significant number of people were sleeping outdoors under plastic sheeting. A fire started as an inmate riot destroyed a large portion of the holding facility on 19 February 2009.

In 2011, as Arab Spring rebellions in Tunisia and Libya disrupted government control over borders and coasts, by May 2011, more than 35,000 immigrants had arrived on the island of Lampedusa from Tunisia and Libya. By the end of August, 48,000 had arrived. As migration and asylum policies are exclusive responsibilities of each member State, the increased migration pressure at the EU Southern border sparked tensions between EU States on how to differentiate between people migrating due to economic reasons, which in principle are regarded as unlawful immigrants and thus are forced to leave or deported, and people fleeing violence or persecution for religious, sexual orientation, political reasons, who can be granted asylum rights. As the Libyan authoritarian governments struggled to keep control of the country, it allowed an increase in northbound migrant flows as a tactic to pressure Italy and the EU not to militarily intervene in the country, as Gaddafi feared his regime would be overthrown.

Some Italian towns and cities disobeyed instructions from the national government to house migrants. The Mafia Capitale investigation revealed that the Italian Mafia profited from the migrant crisis and exploited refugees. The murder of Ashley Ann Olsen in her Italian apartment by an illegal immigrant from Senegal rapidly acquired political significance in the context of the European migrant crisis. The police chief of Florence addressed safety concerns and "assur[ed] the public that Florence remained safe" in the wake of the Olsen murder.

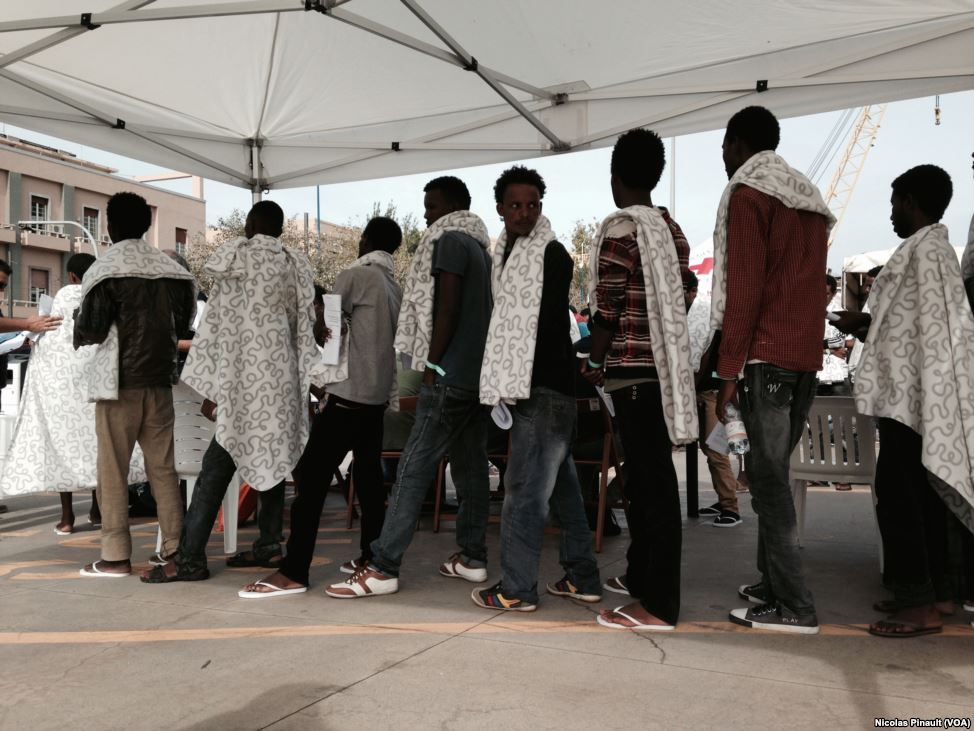
Eritrean migrants in Messina, October 2015

Since 2014, thousands of migrants have tried every month to cross the central Mediterranean to Italy, risking their lives on unsafe boats including fishing trawlers. Many of them were fleeing poverty-stricken homelands or war-torn countries and sought economic opportunity within the EU. Italy, and, in particular, its southern island of Lampedusa, received enormous numbers of Africans and Middle-Easterners transported by smugglers and NGOs operating along the ungoverned coast of the failed state of Libya.

There were 153,842 Mediterranean sea arrivals to Italy in 2015, 9 percent less than the previous year; most of the refugees and migrants came from Eritrea, Nigeria and Somalia, whereas the number of Syrian refugees sharply decreased, as most of them took the Eastern Mediterranean route from Turkey to Greece.

The first three months of 2016 saw an increase in the number of migrants rescued at sea being brought to southern Italian ports. In April 2016, nearly 6,000 mostly sub-Saharan African migrants landed in Italy in four days. In June 2016, over 10,000 migrants were rescued in four days. In 2016, 181,100 migrants arrived in Italy by sea.

In April 2017, more than 8,000 migrants were rescued near Libya and brought to Italy in three days. From January to November 2017, approximately 114,600 migrants arrived in Italy by sea. Approximately 5,000 African migrants were rescued in waters off the coast of Libya between 18 and 20 May 2017.

Since 2013, Italy took in over 700,000 migrants, mainly from sub-Saharan Africa.

In September 2023, Boats, carrying roughly 7,000 migrants—more than the total population of Lampedusa—arrived on the island within the span of 24 hours.

In 2023, 155,754 migrants arrived in Italy by sea, up from 103,846 in 2022.

== Controversies regarding NGOs ==
After 2015, as an increased use of unseaworthy vessels by people smuggling organisations caused a marked increase in accidents at sea involving loss of lives, several European NGOs have started seek and rescue operations in close coordination with Italian Navy and coast guard units. These operations often happen close to Libyan territorial waters at the same time in order not to unlawfully enter Libyan jurisdictions and yet ensure migrants' safety. As per UNCLOS, rescued people are brought to the closer safe harbor, which is in most cases on Italian shore. This effectively means NGOs vessels are covering most of the distance between Libyan and Italian coast. Right-wing Italian newspapers and activists picked on that to make various claims, among which that NGOs active in migrants' assistance and rescue at sea would reap financial profits from their collaboration with the Italian authorities, or that some NGOs are part of unlawful people smuggling operations in coordination with operatives on Libyan coast, and funded by international criminal groups and financial institutions interested in developing political turmoil in Italy. The Italian Parliament investigated these claims and has found them to be unsubstantiated, with no further actions.

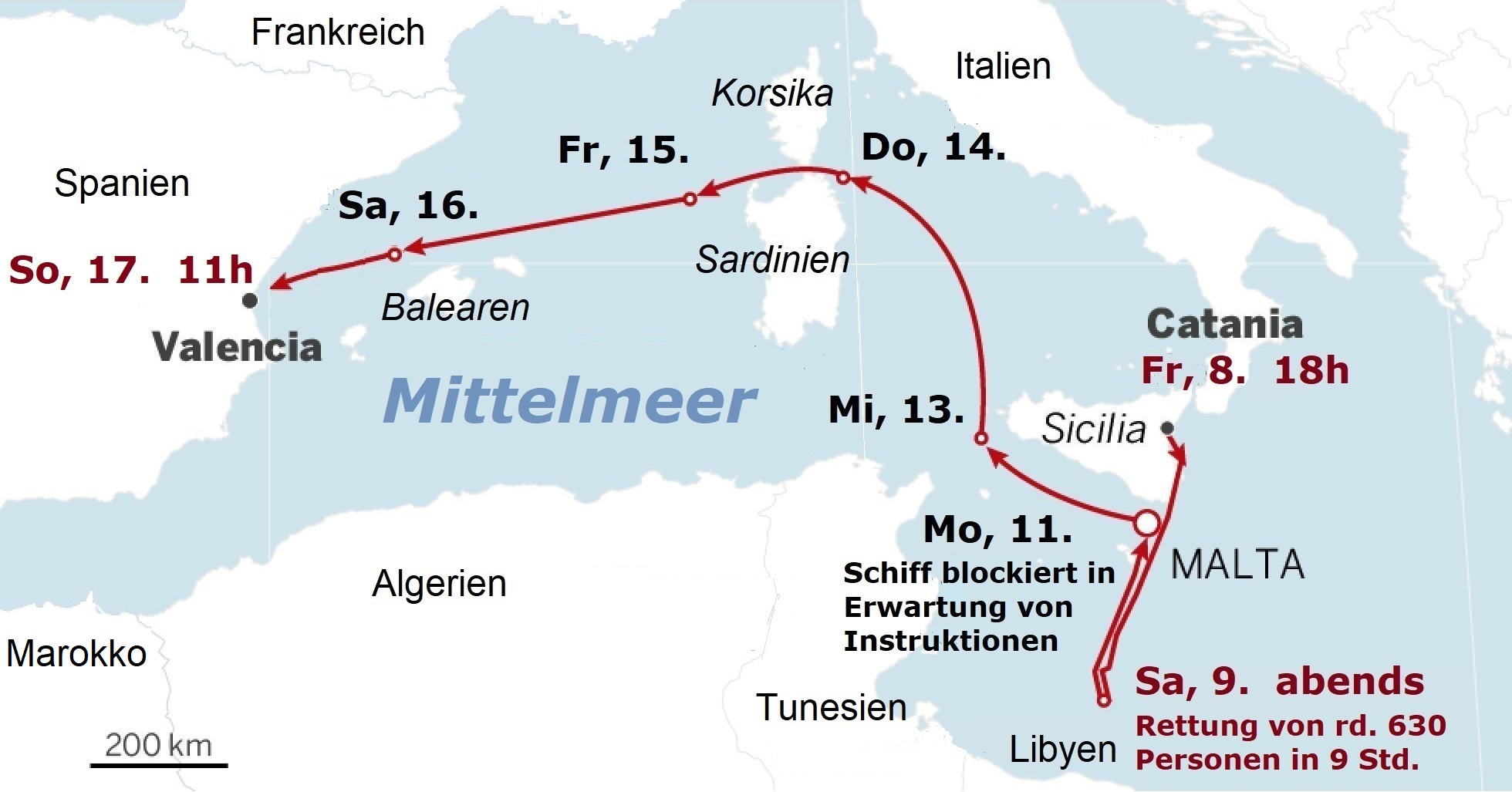
This map shows the journey of Aquarius Dignitus in June 2018, which was refused to dock in Malta and Italy before being granted access by the recently installed left-wing government in Spain.

In August 2017 the ship "Iuventa" operated by the German NGO "Jugend Rettet" (youth to the rescue) was impounded on the island of Lampedusa on the order of an Italian prosecutor on suspicion of facilitating illegal immigration. Jugend Rettet is one of the six out of nine NGOs which refused to sign a new code of conduct by the Italian government covering migrant rescues in the Mediterranean. The prosecutor alleged that there were "contacts, meetings and understandings" between the boat's crew and the smugglers. No crew members from the "Iuventa" had been charged and the prosecutor admitted that their motive was likely humanitarian. (Five out of eight refused to sign the new code of conduct, according to a Guardian article, the others refusing to sign being MSF, the Germany groups Sea-Watch, Sea-Eye and Jugend Rettet, and France's SOS Mediterranée '[all of whom] abstained'. 'MSF, SOS Mediterranée and Jugend Rettet... called for clarification of the rules' while MOAS and Spanish group Proactiva Open Arms agreed to the conditions, and Save the Children 'backed the measures'.)

The Conte I Cabinet, influenced by hard-line Interior Minister Matteo Salvini, refused to let migrant ships dock in its waters. On 10 June 2018, Salvini announced the closure of Italian ports, stating that "Everyone in Europe is doing their own business, now Italy is also raising its head. Let's stop the business of illegal immigration." The vessel Aquarius, which is operated jointly by Médecins Sans Frontières and SOS Méditerranée and carried more than 600 migrants, was refused a port of disembarkation by the Italian authorities despite having been told to rescue the migrants by the same co-ordination centre. The Italian authority told the vessel to ask Malta to provide a disembarkation port, but Malta has also refused. On the following day, the new Spanish Prime Minister Pedro Sánchez accepted the disputed migrant ship. On 12 June 2019, the Sea Watch 3 ship picked up 53 migrants in the Mediterranean off the Libyan coast. Sea Watch 3 rejected an offer to dock at Tripoli, which is considered unsafe by humanitarian organizations, and headed toward Lampedusa. According to a report by the Süddeutsche Zeitung and NGOs this was the nearest safe harbor per maritime law. On 14 June, Italy closed its ports to migrant rescue ships. Salvini refused to allow the ship to dock until other European nations had agreed to take the migrants. Ten of the migrants, including children, pregnant women and those who were ill, were allowed to disembark. On 29 June, without authorization, ship's captain Carola Rackete decided to dock. The motivation for this was that according to her the passengers were exhausted. Rackete was arrested by the Italian authorities after docking. Matteo Salvini accused Rackete of trying to sink an Italian patrol boat that was attempting to intercept her, calling the incident an act of war and demanding the Netherlands government intervention. However, on 2 July, Rackete was released from house arrest after a court ruling that she had broken no laws and acted to protect passengers' safety.

In August 2019, Salvini announced a motion of no confidence against Prime Minister Conte, after growing tensions within the majority. Salvini's alleged gambit failed, as Conte successfully negotiated the formation of a new cabinet with centre-left Democratic Party, which completely changed the immigration policy of the previous government, returning to receive NGO ships in Italian ports.

== Italian naval mission to Libyan waters ==
On 2 August 2017, Italy's parliament authorized a limited naval mission to Libyan waters aimed at supporting the country's coastguard in the fight against illegal migration. Italy sent two patrol boats at the request of the UN-backed government in Tripoli and insisted it had no intention of violating Libyan sovereignty. However, General Khalifa Haftar, who controls most of eastern Libya, threatened to use his own forces to repel the Italians.

== Comparison with other European Union countries 2023 ==
According to Eurostat 59.9 million people lived in the European Union in 2023 who were born outside their resident country. This corresponds to 13.35% of the total EU population. Of these, 31.4 million (9.44%) were born outside the EU and 17.5 million (3.91%) were born in another EU member state.

| Country | Total population (1000) | Total Foreign-born (1000) | % | Born in other EU state (1000) | % | Born in a non EU state (1000) | % |
|---|---|---|---|---|---|---|---|
| EU 27 | 448,754 | 59,902 | 13.3 | 17,538 | 3.9 | 31,368 | 6.3 |
| Germany | 84,359 | 16,476 | 19.5 | 6,274 | 7.4 | 10,202 | 12.1 |
| France | 68,173 | 8,942 | 13.1 | 1,989 | 2.9 | 6,953 | 10.2 |
| Spain | 48,085 | 8,204 | 17.1 | 1,580 | 3.3 | 6,624 | 13.8 |
| Italy | 58,997 | 6,417 | 10.9 | 1,563 | 2.6 | 4,854 | 8.2 |
| Netherlands | 17,811 | 2,777 | 15.6 | 748 | 4.2 | 2,029 | 11.4 |
| Greece | 10,414 | 1,173 | 11.3 | 235 | 2.2 | 938 | 9.0 |
| Sweden | 10,522 | 2,144 | 20.4 | 548 | 5.2 | 1,596 | 15.2 |
| Austria | 9,105 | 1,963 | 21.6 | 863 | 9.5 | 1,100 | 12.1 |
| Belgium | 11,743 | 2,247 | 19.1 | 938 | 8.0 | 1,309 | 11.1 |
| Portugal | 10,467 | 1,684 | 16.1 | 378 | 3.6 | 1,306 | 12.5 |
| Denmark | 5,933 | 804 | 13.6 | 263 | 4.4 | 541 | 9.1 |
| Finland | 5,564 | 461 | 8.3 | 131 | 2.4 | 330 | 5.9 |
| Poland | 36,754 | 933 | 2.5 | 231 | 0.6 | 702 | 1.9 |
| Czech Republic | 10,828 | 764 | 7.1 | 139 | 1.3 | 625 | 5.8 |
| Hungary | 9,600 | 644 | 6.7 | 342 | 3.6 | 302 | 3.1 |
| Romania | 19,055 | 530 | 2.8 | 202 | 1.1 | 328 | 1.7 |
| Slovakia | 5,429 | 213 | 3.9 | 156 | 2.9 | 57 | 1.0 |
| Bulgaria | 6,448 | 169 | 2.6 | 58 | 0.9 | 111 | 1.7 |
| Ireland | 5,271 | 1,150 | 21.8 | 348 | 6.6 | 802 | 15.2 |

== Immigration and crime ==
A 2023 study of Italian towns found the immigration did not increase the probability of crime occurring, just the perception that residents were in more danger of crime, especially when migrants were more culturally distant. According to the ISPI, the Italian prison population in 2018 counted 59655 and of those 34% were foreigners, with the largest groups coming from Morocco (3751), Albania (2568), Romania (2561), Tunisia (2070) and Nigeria (1453). A study of immigration to Italy during the period 1990–2003 found that the size of immigrant population is positively correlated with the incidence of most types of crime, as well as with the overall number of criminal offenses. However, the causal effect seems limited to some categories of crime: murders, robberies and, to a lesser extent, thefts. Over the period 2007–2016, the crime rate among non-Italians decreased by around 65%.

A study of Italy before and after the January 2007 European Union enlargement found that giving legal status to the previously illegal immigrants from the new EU members states led to a "50 percent reduction in recidivism". The authors find that "legal status... explains one-half to two-thirds of the observed differences in crime rates between legal and illegal immigrants". A study on the 2007 so-called "click day" amnesty for undocumented immigrants in Italy found that the amnesty reduced the immigrant crime rate. The authors estimate "that a ten percent increase in the share of immigrants legalized in one region would imply a 0.3 percent reduction in immigrants' criminal charges in the following year in that same region". Research shows that stricter enforcement of migration policy leads to a reduction in the crime rate of undocumented migrants.

According to the latest report by Idos/Unar, immigrants made up 32,6% of prison population in 2015 (four percentage points less than five years before), immigrants making up 8,2% of population in 2015. Prison population data may not give a reliable picture of immigrants' involvement in criminal activity due to different bail and sentencing decisions for foreigners. Foreigners are, for instance, far more overrepresented in the prison population than their share of convictions relative to the native population. According to a 2013 study, the majority of foreign prisoners are held in connection with a drug offence. One out of every nine offences ascribed to foreign prisoners concerns violation of 'laws governing foreigners'. The 2013 study cites literature that points to discriminatory practices against foreigners by Italian law enforcement, judiciary and penal system.

According to a 2013 report, "undocumented immigrants are responsible for the vast majority of crimes committed in Italy by immigrants... the share of undocumented immigrants varies between 60 and 70 percent for violent crimes, and it increases to 70–85 for property crime. In 2009, the highest shares are in burglary (85), car theft (78), theft (76), robbery (75), assaulting public officer / resisting arrest (75), handling stolen goods (73)." The 2013 report observes that "immigrants accounted for almost 23 percent of the criminal charges although they represented only 6‐7 percent of the resident population" in 2010.

According to 2007 data, the crime rate of legal immigrants was 1.2–1.4% whereas the crime rate was 0.8% for native Italians. The overrepresentation is partly due to the large number of young legal immigrants, the crime rate is 1.9% for legal immigrants aged 18–44 whereas it is 1.5% for their Italian peers; 0.4% for legal immigrants aged 45–64 years whereas it is 0.7% for their Italian peers; and for those over 65 years old, the crime rates is the same among natives and foreigners. 16.9% of crimes committed by legal immigrants aged 18–44 are linked to violations of immigration laws. By excluding those crimes, the crime rate of legal immigrants aged 18–44 is largely the same as that of same aged Italians.

A 2016 report by Confcommercio found that between 2010 and 2014, illegal immigrants committed crimes at approximately 57 times the rate of Italians, and 29 times the rate of other foreigners, though it also found that immigration reduces the crime rate when it is characterized by participation and integration.

=== Prison population ===
According to the Ministry of Justice, the Italian prison population in 2019 counted 60,769 and of those 32.7% were foreigners. The largest groups came from Morocco (3,651), Albania (2,402), Romania (2,386), Tunisia (2,020) and Nigeria (1,665).

Amongst national origins counting more than 5,000 individuals at national level, Algeria, followed by Gambia and Tunisia, had the biggest proportion of detainees (with, respectively, 25.8, 23.7 and 20.7 inmates per 1,000 residents). On the other hand, Japan, Thailand and the Philippines had the lowest proportion of inmates per 1,000 residents (respectively, 0.13, and 0.50 for both Thailand and the Philippines).

== See also ==
- List of countries by foreign-born population
- Lampedusa immigrant reception center
