= Murder of Pamela Mastropietro =

2018 crime in Macerata, Italy

- Pamela Mastropietro
- Born: 23 August 1999; Rome, Italy
- Died: 30 January 2018 (aged 18); Macerata, Marche, Italy
- Cause of death: Knife wounds leading to blood loss and suffocation
- Burial: Campo Verano, Rome
- Convicted: Innocent Oseghale (life imprisonment)
- Foundation: Associazione Pamela Mastropietro

Pamela Mastropietro was an 18-year-old Italian woman who was last seen on 29 January 2018. She was murdered soon after in Macerata, Marche. Her murderer, a Nigerian migrant drug dealer named Innocent Oseghale, was convicted and sentenced to life in prison with 18 months of isolation in May 2019. The sentence was confirmed on appeal in October 2020. The murder caused public outrage, anger, as well as anti-immigrant sentiment in Macerata. Her death has been cited as a motive for the shooting of African migrants by perpetrator Luca Traini that left six seriously wounded.

== Background ==
Mastropietro was born and raised in a working class community in Rome. Mastropietro had been drawn to Macerata, a medieval town near the coast of the Adriatic Sea, for its tranquility. In her early teens, she was groomed and began dating a Romanian drug dealer and became addicted to drugs.

== Murder and investigation ==
At the time of her murder, 18-year-old Mastropietro had been staying for several weeks at a drug-treatment centre overlooking vineyards in the hills near Macerata. On 29 January, she left the rehabilitation centre to buy drugs at Diaz Gardens, a park outside Macerata's city walls characterized by sinuous roads, filled with drug dealers, many of whom were migrants. In the park, Mastropietro was believed to have been led to a 30-year-old Nigerian named Innocent Oseghale, who had arrived in Italy on 26 August 2014, during a peak migration period. On 31 January, police found Mastropietro's body dismembered and hidden in two suitcases. Although she was believed to be a murder victim, the exact cause of her death had not been determined as of February 2018. Soon after, Italian police said they found her bloodied clothing at the home of Innocent Oseghale, a Nigerian who moved to Italy in 2014 but who had dropped out of a refugee assistance program and begun selling drugs.

Mastropietro's funeral was held on 29 May 2018 at Rome's Ognissanti church, before burial at Campo Verano. Flowers were left by the local Nigerian community and diplomatic staff, Rome mayor Virginia Raggi, and Luca Traini, who opened fire against several African migrants in Macerata days after the murder.

Oseghale, described as "a 30-year-old Nigerian with an expired residency permit and a criminal record of drug dealing", was arrested soon after the body and clothing were found. Along with Oseghale, police arrested two other Nigerian men.

In February 2018, Alessandro Meluzzi, a psychiatrist and criminologist, alleged that the murder was associated with Nigerian organized crime gangs.

In March 2018, an autopsy showed that the cause of death was two abdominal stabbings, and not an overdose as alleged by Oseghale.

On 7 June 2018, Giovanni Maria Manzoni, the magistrate of Macerata, dropped orders of detention on charges of murder, vilification, and destruction and concealment of corpse, against the two men accused alongside Oseghale; these two men remained in prison for heroin charges. Matteo Salvini, the newly-elected Deputy Prime Minister of Italy and Minister of the Interior, often mentioned the Mastropietro murder as part of his hard-on-crime policies and skepticism towards illegal immigration.

In March 2019, a former 'Ndrangheta member named Vincenzo Marino, who had shared a cell with Oseghale, was called as a key witness against Oseghale's claim that Mastropietro died of a heroin overdose and his only responsibility was the dismemberment. In Marino's testimony, Mastropietro threatened to call the police on Oseghale, who then stabbed her in the liver. He went back to Diaz Gardens to find an unnamed friend to help conceal the body, then began dismembering her. As she unexpectedly still showed signs of life, he stabbed her again. Marino also said that Oseghale mentioned being in the Nigerian mafia. Marino said that Oseghale started dismembering Pamela while she was still alive, starting from one of her feet.

== Subsequent events ==
Between her escape from the rehabilitation clinic and her arrival in Macerata, Mastropietro was given lifts in two local men's cars. Both men were accused of rape for having sex with her while she was not mentally capable of giving consent. The cases were closed by the court in June 2020, as such charges could only have been brought against the men by Mastropietro herself.

In June 2020, Mastropietro's uncle and lawyer Marco Verni took the knee in her memory during court proceedings during the George Floyd protests. He said that while he sympathised with Floyd's cause, he disagreed with some murder victims having more public and political support than others. A year earlier, he published a photograph of Pamela's severed head, justifying his decision by pointing to pro-migrant activists who share photographs of drowned migrants.

In October 2020, 22-year-old Romanian Claudiu Nitu, Mastropietro's ex-boyfriend, was sentenced to three years in prison for attempting to introduce her to prostitution in order to pay for drugs.

In January 2023, Mastropietro's mother, Alessandra Verni, wore a t-shirt with images of her daughter's decapitated and dismembered body as a protest to a hearing where Oseghale was contesting some additional charges related to the murder. Stefano Mastropietro, Pamela's father, died in May 2023 of a suspected heart attack.

== See also ==
- List of solved missing person cases (post-2000)
- Macerata shooting
- Murder of Ashley Ann Olsen
- Murder of Desirée Mariottini
- Murder of Meredith Kercher
- Murders of Louisa Vesterager Jespersen and Maren Ueland
- Murder of Philippine Le Noir de Carlan
