= Killing of Shanquella Robinson =

2022 murder in Mexico of an American tourist

Shanquella Robinson
- Undated photo of Robinson
- Born: Shanquella Brenada Robinson; January 9, 1997; Charlotte, North Carolina, U.S.
- Died: October 29, 2022 (aged 25); Cabo San Lucas, Mexico
- Cause of death: Homicide
- Parents: Bernard Robinson (father); Salamondra Robinson (mother)

Shanquella Brenada Robinson (January 9, 1997 – October 29, 2022) was an American businesswoman, founder of a women's fashion clothing line, hairstylist, and social media personality from North Carolina, United States, who was murdered while on vacation in Mexico.

She died on October 29, 2022, shortly after travelling with a friend and a group of loose acquaintances to the Mexican resort town of Cabo San Lucas.

There was considerable public interest and intrigue surrounding the cause of her death. In addition, substantial collaborative efforts of citizen journalism and amateur news bloggers played an important role in bringing attention to Robinson's death, to the point of Mexican authorities facing enhanced scrutiny, particularly because the municipal Police Department initially treated the death as a case of conventional tourist alcohol intoxication.

A video subsequently emerged depicting Shanquella being assaulted in a rental villa before her death.

The events surrounding her death, along with the medical care provided, the police report, and forensic investigations into the cause, have resulted in a prominent, ongoing transnational criminal inquiry involving both the United States and Mexico.

== Background ==
Shanquella graduated from Winston-Salem State University, a historically black college. In her hometown of Charlotte, North Carolina, she operated multiple boutique beauty and children's hair-braiding businesses under the brands 'Exquisite Kids' and 'Exquisite Boutique'.

On October 28, 2022, Shanquella embarked on a brief vacation to Mexico accompanied by a friend and five other travelers, consisting of three women and three men. Among them were Khalil Cooke, Malik St Patrick Dyer, Wenter Essence Donovan, Alysse Michelle Hyatt, Daejhanae Jackson (now E’mani Green), and Nazeer Wiggins, collectively referred to as the 'Cabo Six'.

The group arrived at a luxury rental apartment located in the Puerto Los Cabos resort, situated in the resort town of Cabo San Lucas, Mexico.

== Death ==
On October 29, 2022, shortly after the group's arrival, at approximately 2:13 pm, a physician from the American Medical Centre in Cabo San Lucas was called to attend to a resort resident who was experiencing health issues.

Approximately at the same time, Salamondra Robinson, Shanquella's mother, received a call from one of her daughter's travel companions informing her that Shanquella had fallen ill and that a doctor was en route to assist her.

Dr. Karolina Beatriz Ornelas-Gutiérrez from the American Medical Centre arrived within an hour and found "a female in stable condition, but dehydrated, disorientated, verbally unresponsive, unable to communicate, and appearing to be intoxicated".

The explanation given to the doctor was that Robinson "drank a lot of alcohol". The doctor recommended that Robinson be admitted into the hospital, but her travel companions insisted she be treated in the apartment room.

During medical treatment, the doctor attempted to administer an IV-drip. However, Robinson's condition worsened when she suffered a tonic–clonic seizure (a stiffening of the body, arms, and legs) around 4:13 pm, about one hour after the doctor's arrival. An ambulance was called around 4:20 pm after Robinson began having trouble breathing, with her pulse dropping as well. Robinson then suffered a cardiac arrest.

Ambulant paramedics called to the scene around 4:49 pm tried to resuscitate Robinson, administering fourteen CPR rounds of cardiac-vascular compressions and intrathoracic pressure to her chest, in an attempt to (re)establish venous blood-oxygen saturation and blood flow, as well as injecting five doses of adrenaline and six electrical discharges from a defibrillator. However, they were unable to revive any return of heartbeat, pulse, blood flow, pupillary reflexes, or other human vital signs.

Shanquella Robinson was declared clinically dead at 5:57 pm, according to the police report.

=== Police report ===
Police officers "Omar" and "David" of the Los Cabos Municipal Police Department were the first responding officers at the scene around 5:25 pm. They were briefed by Dr. Ornelas-Gutiérrez, who informed the officers that medical treatment was requested for a young lady who had ingested "too much alcohol". She briefed the officers that she had found a female in stable but unresponsive condition, and that she had planned to admit her to hospital, but her travel companions objected, claiming they instead requested that the young lady be treated in the hotel room. Paramedics arrived and her condition worsened.

After Robinson was declared dead, the investigating police officers notified the General Prosecutor's Office (attorney general) in the state of Baja California Sur, reaching the state's attorney, Julio Daniel, around 6:35 pm and informing him of the death of a foreign citizen. They were instructed to file reports and investigation forms before handing the case to ministerial police.

Based on eyewitness accounts and consultation with Dr. Ornelas-Gutiérrez, the police report concluded that a "person had died of alcohol poisoning, and that she died two hours and 45 minutes after the doctor was called to the residence. There was no observation of internal or external injuries in the police report.

Based on this police report and the investigations of the Mexican authorities, the US State Department initially released a statement reporting that "Mexican authorities claimed there was no clear evidence Robinson was murdered".

=== Coroner's report ===
On November 5, a notarized English translation of Robinson's death certificate, based on an autopsy report from forensic doctor Rene A. Galvan-Oseguera from the Secretariat Of Health, Baja California Sur, dated November 4, 2022, was released. The autopsy report described Robinson's death had occurred 15 minutes after suffering a severe spinal cord injury. and an atlas luxation, which is a dislocation or separation at the skull base from the atlas bone, (which is the first bone of the neck and spinal column).^{γ}

The forensic doctor made the following forensic observations in the official autopsy report:

Date and time of death: October 29, 2022 – 15:00 pm.

Cause of death: Severe Spinal Cord Injury and Atlas Luxation.^{β}

Approximate time between injury and death: 15 minutes

Situation, circumstance or reason in which the injury occurred: Person found unconscious in her living room.

Was it accidental or violent death? No accident, it was violent^{α}

The autopsy report mentioned neither cardiac arrest nor alcohol poisoning.

== Investigation ==
=== U.S. Department of State ===
On November 16, the U.S. Department of State responded that they were aware of the incident, releasing the following statement:

"We are aware of these reports. Protecting the welfare of U.S. citizens overseas is among our top priorities. Out of respect for the privacy of those involved, we have no further comment at this time."

=== Family's doubts of conflicting accounts ===
As Salamondra Robinson, Shanquella's mother, disclosed during an ABC News Good Morning America interview, her family became suspicious of the claims of her daughter's travel companions after each one of them had different and inconsistent stories.

Some of her travel companions claimed a maid had found her unconscious. Some also reported that they had called a doctor. And some said the concierge called the doctor. They at first claimed Shanquella had died of alcohol poisoning and a few days later admitted that "there had been a fight and that she was fighting and she had also been jumped."

Regarding the location where Robinson was found unconscious, her travel associates raised further confusion and skepticism when one told her mother they found Shanquella unconscious on the floor. Yet another person claimed they found her in a bed, and another travel companion told her father, Bernard Robinson, that they had found her in a chair.

Shanquella's mother told CBS News during an interview that her daughter's loose acquaintances initially suggested her daughter had fallen ill from alcohol poisoning, which surprised her. She was also told that a doctor was just on the way to their apartment. She insisted that her daughter be taken to an emergency room, but her daughter's travel companions lied to her, claiming her daughter's travel insurance was of no use in Mexico and that the emergency room required $5,000 in cash for her daughter to be seen.

She recalled how further doubts began to surface, when the autopsy report emerged, showing the cause of death a broken neck, instead of alcohol poisoning. During an interview with Queen City News, Ms. Robinson also said her daughter's body showed obvious signs of trauma (a contusion and swelling of her head, a bruised face, swollen eye, and a busted lip). Her body was sent back to the United States on November 12. Shanquella Robinson's funeral took place on November 19 which was held at the Macedonia Baptist Church in Charlotte, North Carolina.

For more than two weeks, the family attempted to convince authorities in the United States and Mexico that their daughter's death was suspicious and needed further investigation.

In a statement by Robinson's family published to GoFundMe (a crowdfunding page raising funds for the family's legal fees), Robinson's sister, Quilla Long, announced the family will continue to investigate what happened. "The United States State Department released a statement claiming 'no clear evidence of foul play,' yet there is a video circulating of a woman violently attacking Shanquella," Long said. "This statement is unacceptable, and we are beyond devastated. We continue to fight for the truth."

=== Local journalists first reporting on the case ===
Gerardo Zuñiga, a Mexican journalist for regional news from Baja California Sur, began covering the murder of Shanquella Robinson. He had previously published an article which looked into the death of another American, 73-year-old retiree Rodney Davis, who was kidnapped while hiking and camping on the out-and-back trail of Loreto-Juncalito, Baja California Sur, murdered, found dead, and identified through DNA by the local police.

In mid-November 2022, Mexican journalists covering Davis' case were tipped off by local police that another American tourist, Shanquella Robinson, had been killed four days after Davis was murdered, and started hearing rumors about a video of the incident being shared among Winston-Salem students.

=== Leaked video ===
Beginning with a video of the incident being uploaded to Twitter, a wave of viral cellphone footage began surfacing on several social media outlets of a naked black woman being viciously beaten by one of her female acquaintances in a bedroom of a vacation rental. Salamondra Robinson confirmed that it was her daughter being beaten in the video.

In the video, an attacker in frenzied rage begins to viciously punch Robinson, with continuous jabs to her head, beating her from one side of a large hotel bed, to another corner of the bed, while violently yanking her neck and throwing the victim onto the floor. The attacker delivers further furious blows to Robinson's face and kicks her head with her knee before stumbling back to the other side of the room, ending her assault on Robinson.

There were at least two other people present during the altercation. A male filmed the assault and another person filmed the male capturing the event. The footage included a male who can be heard recommending to Robinson: "Quella? Can you at least fight back? At least sum'in'?", to which Robinson responded "No!", indicating that she didn't want to fight.

The video was shocking to people all across social media networks, The video subsequently raised questions about why no one intervened in the brutal beating but instead chose to record the beating on a cellphone. Voices in the media have also called into question why suspects and witnesses in a homicide investigation were freely allowed to return to the United States without any investigation.

=== Second State Attorney General investigation ===
On November 16, the State Attorney General's Office of Baja California Sur reopened their investigation into Robinson's death as a possible femicide, confirming investigators had revisited the crime scene and were collecting "more evidence to achieve the accurate clarification of the events." In a statement released to the press, they disclosed:

"The State Attorney General's Office (PGJE) of Baja California Sur carries out the field and cabinet proceedings to clarify the facts in which a female person of foreign origin lost her life, on October 29, in a beach club in San José del Cabo.

It is reported that last Saturday, October 29, at approximately 6:15 pm, he received a call from a public security element who reported that, in a house in the Fundadores Beach Club subdivision, in San José del Cabo, there was a woman without life.

State criminal investigation agents moved to the scene, where the first investigations were carried out under the corresponding protocols.

Experts from the Directorate of Expert Services carried out the processing of the place, looking for clues that will be attached to the investigation folder.

The PGJE maintains the lines of investigation to collect more evidence to achieve the accurate clarification of the facts, without ruling out any hypothesis."

According to the local newspaper, authorities were also investigating the doctor, two officers of the local police force, and the investigating the states attorney with regards to negligence, official misconduct, and dereliction of duties, as part of their inquiry.

=== FBI investigation ===
On November 18, the Federal Bureau of Investigation (FBI) field office in Charlotte, North Carolina, confirmed "it has also opened an investigation in the death of Charlotte resident, Shanquella Robinson in Cabo San Lucas, Mexico, on or about October 29, 2022. Due to the ongoing investigation, we have no further comment." "Our investigation is completely separate from Mexico, I am not privy to anything they are doing," a spokesperson added.

A group of agents from the FBI's Charlotte field office were reportedly seen at the crime scene in Los Cabos, according to local news reports.

In April 2023, the FBI announced that federal prosecutors would not seek charges related to Robinson's death because of insufficient evidence.

== Criminal charge of homicide ==
On November 23, 2022, Daniel de la Rosa Anaya, Attorney General of Baja California General Prosecutor's Office issued an arrest warrant relating to the homicide against a person identified as an American which was the "direct aggressor" in the death of Shanquella Robinson.

During a video interview with local newspaper BCS Noticias, Daniel de la Rosa Anaya clarified the cause of death was not due to alcohol intake or injuries sustained in a fight, but rather from a "direct assault" causing a spinal cord fracture.

The Prosecutors' Office had approached Mexican federal prosecutors and US officials to "carry out all relevant procedures [...] issuing an Interpol Red Alert to locate the suspect in the United States" and "working on formal extradition proceedings to extradite the suspect back to Mexico."

The Governor of Baja California Sur, Víctor Manuel Castro Cosío, echoed the same sentiments. He reflected upon the beginnings of the investigation when "he did not have the precise data on that occasion, and that it had initially been reported as an accident in a hotel, but then the investigation proved homicide.

Local news reported that an arrest warrant had been issued for one of Robinson's travel companions, but to date no one has been officially charged.

== See also ==
- Femicide in Mexico
- Violence against women in Mexico
- List of United States crime-related lists
- List of unsolved murders (2000–present)
- Murder of Maria Lauterbach – An eight-months pregnant United States Marine who was killed by a fellow (Mexican born) US Marine, whom she had accused of rape, and whom the Federal Bureau of Investigation (FBI), the Naval Criminal Investigative Service (NCIS), the Judge Advocate General (JAG) and the Interpol extradited back from Mexico to the United States in a two-year-long extradition procedure, ahead of his sentencing to life in prison.
- Death of Tamla Horsford – An African-American woman who died at a "Soccer moms" sleepover.
- Murder of Meredith Kercher – A British citizen killed during a vacation in Italy.
- Malcolm Shabazz – An African-American tourist and grandson of Malcolm X killed in Mexico.
- Murder of Ashley Ann Olsen – An American killed by an acquaintance during an Italy vacation.

== Notes ==
^α It remains unclear whether coroner meant to select "Yes: it was accidental" or "Yes: it was a violent death".
^β It is also unclear if the doctor treating Robinson was aware Robinson had sustained a broken neck, and if she was able to make any material diagnosis relating to neck injuries within the confines of a hotel room.
^γ An injury that often occurs when a person's head is violently yanked or twisted away from the neck.
