= Febronia of Nisibis =

Saint

Saint Febronia
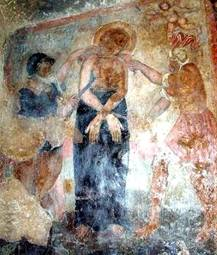
- Martyrdom of St. Phebronia, fresco in the Byzantine monastery of St. Phebronia, Palagonia

Virgin and martyr
- Born: 284
- Died: 304
- Venerated in: Eastern Orthodox Church Oriental Orthodoxy Roman Catholic Church
- Canonized: Pre-Congregation
- Major shrine: San Carlo ai Catinari, Rome
- Feast: 25 June Roman Catholic Church 12 February Eastern Orthodox Church; 25 June Greek Orthodox Church; 1 Epip Coptic Church Tuesday after second Sunday of the Exaltation of the Cross Armenian Apostolic Church
- Attributes: Palm of martyrdom and the shears used to cut off her breasts
- Patronage: Palagonia, Sicily

Phebronia of Nisibis, also known as Phebronia of Sebapte, was a nun at Nisibis, Roman Empire (modern-day Nusaybin, Turkey). She suffered persecution under Diocletian, who offered her freedom if she renounced her faith and married his nephew, Lysimachus, who had been leaning towards conversion to Christianity. Febronia refused and was tortured, suffered mutilation and death. Lysimachus, witnessing her suffering, converted.

Saint Phebronia's tomb can be found in a monastery named after her in the village of Himo, near the city of Qamishli in northeastern Syria.

Phebronia is one of the 140 Colonnade saints whose images adorn St. Peter's Square. She is known as a Holy Virgin Martyr.

In the Coptic Orthodox Church, her feast day is 1 Epip which corresponds to 8 July (Gregorian Calendar) or 25 June (Julian Calendar).
