= Murder of Desirée Mariottini =

Murder of a 16-year-old Italian girl

- Died: 18 October 2018, Via Dei Lucani 22 Rome, Lazio, Italy
- Cause of death: Respiratory distress due to drug overdose, repeated torture, and sexual assault.
- Arrested: Mamadou Gara; Brian Minteh; Alinno Chima; Yusif Salia
- Convicted: Mamadou Gara (22 years in prison); Alinno Chima (26 years in prison); Brian Minthe (18 years in prison); Yousef Salia (life imprisonment)

Desirée Mariottini (September 13, 2002 — October 18, 2018) was a 16-year-old Italian murder victim killed by African migrants, last seen on 18 October 2018 in Rome, Italy.

== Background ==
Mariottini was reportedly born and lived in Cisterna di Latina in the region of Lazio.

== Murder and investigation ==
On 17 October 2018, Mariottini reportedly missed the last bus and did not return to her home, and was found dead one day later.

Mariottini was drugged and sexually assaulted in a "drug den" in the San Lorenzo district in Rome. While unconscious, Mariottini was assaulted multiple times by an unknown number of assailants. An autopsy showed she had taken drugs as early as the afternoon of October 18, and died later on the night of 19 October. It also showed that Mariottini was likely raped as she was dying.

On 25 October, two people were arrested for the murder: Mamadou Gara, 26 and Brian Minteh, 43. Both are accused, along other suspects, of gang rape, drug possession and voluntary homicide. The police are looking for at least two other men involved in the murder. The criminals were identified after a series of testimonies and findings made in the building where the body was found.

Around October 26, two more arrests were made in the case; Alinno Chima, age 40, and Yusif Salia, whose age was not specified.

=== Trial ===
The trial of the four accused began in October 2019.

Gara and Salia were sentenced to life in prison, Chima to 27 years and Minthe to 24 and a half. Findings and sentence were confirmed on appeal.

=== Second Appeal Trial (May 2024) ===
Following a ruling by the Court of Cassation that ordered a partial retrial, the Rome Court of Assizes of Appeal handed down updated sentences on May 29, 2024.

- Mamadou Gara: Reduced from life imprisonment to 22 years, with the charge reclassified from voluntary homicide to death as a consequence of another crime.
- Alinno Chima: Reduced from 27 years to 26 years.
- Brian Minthe: Reduced from 24 years to 18 years (after being acquitted of supplying narcotic substances).
- Yousef Salia: His original life imprisonment sentence remained final and unchanged.

=== Final Confirmation (October 2024) ===
- On October 17, 2024, Italy's Supreme Court (Court of Cassation) rendered the verdicts definitive, locking in the reduced sentences for Gara and Chima, alongside the prior final convictions for Minthe and Salia.

== Aftermath ==
Mariottini was buried on Sunday 30 October in Cisterna di Latina in a ceremony attended by hundreds and Mayor of Rome Virginia Raggi declared a day of mourning.

=== Visit by Minister Matteo Salvini at the scene of the crime ===
On October 24, 2018 interior minister Matteo Salvini, the leader of the anti-illegal migration Northern League party, went to the abandoned building where the girl's body was found.

Residents of the San Lorenzo district prevented Salvini from placing a rose outside the building where the victim was found, feeling Salvini was exploiting the young woman's death. He returned later in the day unannounced and placed the flowers in front of the gate.

=== Pronouncements by the President of the European Parliament Antonio Tajani ===
The tragedy of Desirée "must be the last that happens in Italy and in Rome, an abandoned city, the degradation is evident, moral and social, more checks are needed in the city, more men and women of the police are needed, especially at night".

=== The decision of the mayor of Rome ===
The Rome Mayor Virginia Raggi decided to proclaim a day of mourning for the city in conjunction with the funeral of Desirée Mariottini. She also declared the intention of city authorities to have the building demolished. In a social media post, she stated that as a mayor, as a woman and the mayor of the city she could not tolerate the thought of this crime and called it an "atrocious crime".

On the evening of 25 October 2018, a spontaneous torch-light procession by the people of Rome San Lorenzo was organized to ask for "justice for Desirée".

==== Protests against the mayor of Rome ====
On 27 October 2018, the citizens of Rome protested against deterioration of the city, citing unsafe, damaged buildings and excessive drug use as some of their concerns.

== See also ==
- List of solved missing person cases (post-2000)
- Murder of Meredith Kercher
- Murder of Ashley Ann Olsen
- Murder of Pamela Mastropietro
