= San Pietro Apostolo, Palagonia =

Church in Italy

Coordinates: 37.32260°N 14.74805°E

San Pietro Apostolo ("St Peter Apostle") is a Baroque-style Roman Catholic church located on the central plaza of the town of Palagonia in Sicily, Italy.

== History ==
A church at the site is documented since the 11th century. The present church is the result of various reconstructions, due to damages by the earthquakes of 1542 and 1693. The church rebuilt after 1542 was very likely larger than the prior structure, and added the bell-tower. The latest reconstruction, started in 1704, was patronized by prince D. Ferdinando Francesco Gravina. His coat of arms is present above one of the side portals of the facade. The main portal, in a late-Renaissance style, likely derives from the 1542 church. The church has a Latin-cross layout with a central nave and two aisles. The transept has two chapels richly decorated in polychrome marble and stucco. The interior has an altarpiece depicting the Martyrdom of Saint Febronia.
