= San Pietro Apostolo, Alcamo =

Church building in Alcamo, Italy

San Pietro Apostolo
- Chiesa di San Pietro Apostolo
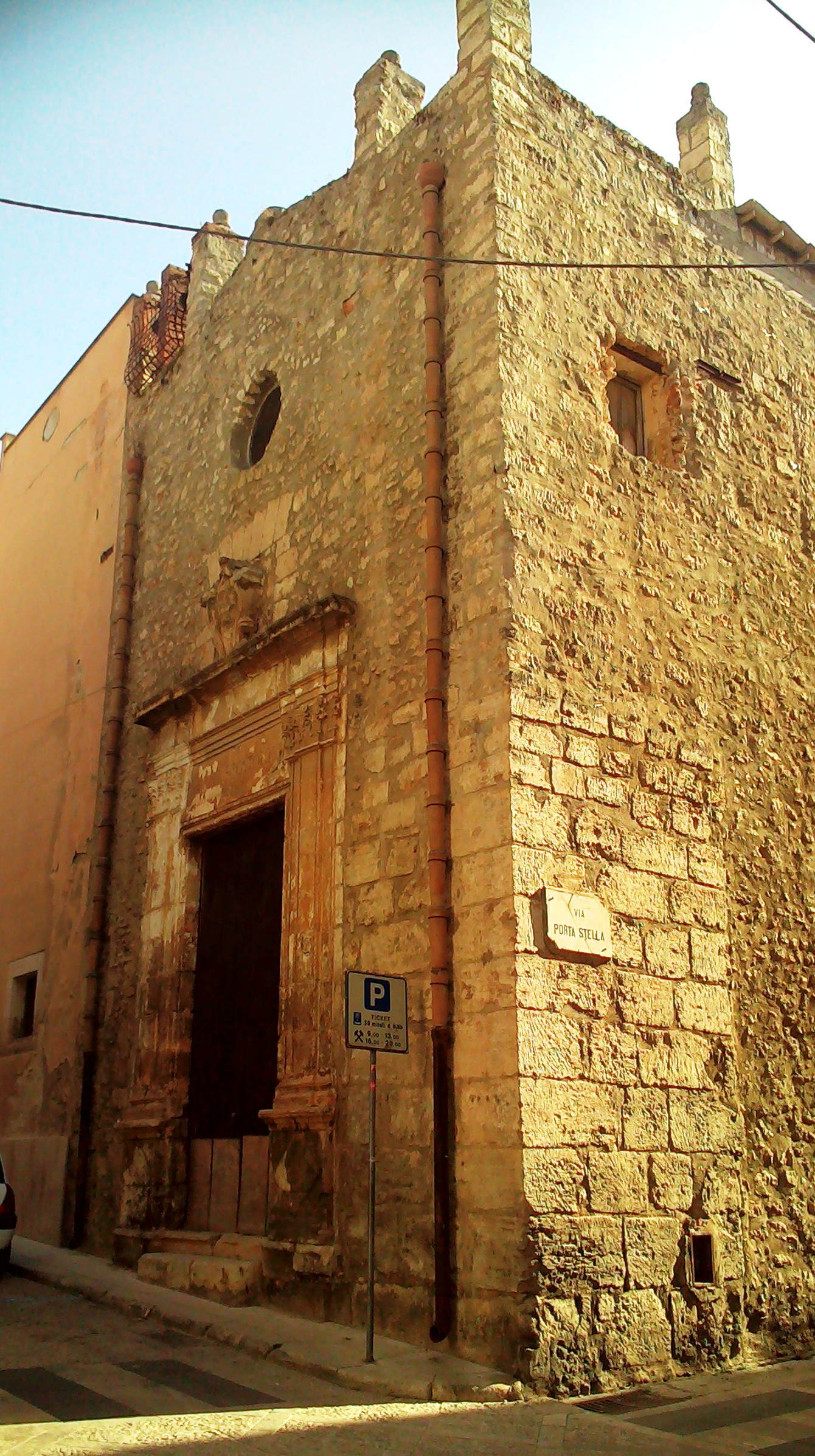
- The façade

Religion
- Affiliation: Benedictine
- Province: province of Trapani
- Region: Sicily
- Rite: Catholic
- Patron: Saint Peter the Apostle

Location
- Location: Alcamo, province of Trapani, Italy
- Municipality: Alcamo
- State: Italy
- Interactive map of San Pietro Apostolo
- Territory: Alcamo
- Coordinates: 37°58′49″N 12°58′00″E

Architecture
- Architect: Giovan Biagio Amico
- Funded by: Francesco Graffeo, a priest
- Groundbreaking: 1645
- Completed: 1649

San Pietro Apostolo ("Saint Peter the Apostle") is a Catholic church in Alcamo in the province of Trapani.

Adjoining it there is the Orfanotrofio Femminile di San Pietro.

== History ==
This church is one of the oldest ones in Alcamo, as it is proved by a document dating back to 1367. Annexed to a female Orphanage in 1631, it was rebuilt during the years 1645–1649 at the expense of Francesco Graffeo, a priest, and was widened in 1742 after the design of the architect Giovanni Biagio Amico and with an elegant series of stuccoes.

The roof, fallen down owing to the 1968 Belice earthquake, was reconstructed about 20 years ago; thanks to the financing of 300 millions liras and the zeal of its president Mario Adamo, the Office of Works (Genio civile) put out on contract for the works of restoration and consolidation. Then they repaired the roofing to avoid any further damage due to bad weather.

Unfortunately the surviving decorations have been damaged by the years of exposure to atmospheric agents. The interior is not integral altogether, but now it is important that it has been safeguarded.

== The church today ==
During the last years the church has been used for cultural and political events. The administration had been requested by the local section of FAI, but as the owner of the building is a public body, it cannot be used on loan.

After 70 years, on Saturday 22 February 2025, feast of the Chair of Saint Peter, the church has been opened to cult with a celebration presided by the bishop of the Roman Catholic Diocese of Trapani, monsignor Pietro Maria Fragnelli, who has decided to open it every Saturday for the religious rites.

== Benedictine Nuns ==
According to the assertion by the Benedictine Father Pietro Antonio Tornamira, in one of his works dating back to 1664, a group of Oblate Benedictine Nuns of the Third Order administrated "the House of the Young Girls of Saint Peter.

Since 1631, very probably these Nuns, besides charitable actions, devoted themselves to the education of the girls sheltered in the Orphanage, and also made some handicrafts (weaving, sewing, mending and embroidery) earning their livings from the proceeds. . Even after 1866, when the institution passed to the local municipality, they continues these activities

Today these premises are run by IPAB (Public Institution of Assistance and Charity: Opere Pie Pastore and San Pietro) and the activities connexed with hospitality and education of poor children are carried on.

== Description and works ==
The 1649 main portal is remarkable for its artistic beauty. In the Church, which was with one nave, there were these five altars:

- Saint Peter, a 17th century valuable painting, on the high altar

On the side altars there were placed the following paintings:

- saint Rosalia
- Our Lady with Saint Benedict.
- Our Lady of Sorrows
- Jesus’ birth, a painting

The group of works that today are hosted at the Sacred Art Museum inside the Basilica of Our Lady of the Assumption; among these there is also a painting which represents Saint Peter and another one with Saint Rosalia, probable works of one of Pietro Novelli’ pupils.

The ancient maiolica floor and the tombstone of the priest Vincenzo Graffeo are still kept in a good and unusual state of preservation.

== Sources ==
- Carlo Cataldo: Guida storico-artistica dei beni culturali di Alcamo-Calatafimi-Castellammare del Golfo p. 82; Sarograf, Alcamo, 1982
- Carlo Cataldo: La conchiglia di S.Giacomo p. 227; Campo, Alcamo, 2001
