= Murder of Ashley Ann Olsen =

Murder of an American woman in Italy

Ashley Ann Olsen was an American woman living in Florence, Italy, who was strangled in her apartment in January 2016 by an illegal immigrant from Senegal.

== Context ==
The case drew attention as one of a number of murders committed by migrants during the European migrant crisis. According to the New York Times, the New Year's Eve sexual assaults in Germany "resonated in Italy", and the police chief of Florence addressed safety worries, "assuring the public that Florence remained safe" in the wake of the Olsen murder."

=== Sexual harassment ===
Olsen's murder was discussed as an example of the sexual harassment that women, especially young, foreign women, face in Italian cities, and of the victim blaming of young, attractive female murder victims for their own deaths.

Olsen was killed at a time of rising public concern about miscommunication regarding consent to sexual activity between migrant men and European women, and international attention was focused on the New Year's Eve sexual assaults in Germany that took place in a number of cities just days before Olsen was killed. In January, Denmark debated a proposal to ban anyone who could not speak Danish, German or English from entering a bar or nightclub, and news discussion of the proposal included the Ashley Ann Olsen case.

== Victim ==
Olsen was the daughter of Walter and Paula Olsen, of Summer Haven, Florida. She was a 1999 graduate of St. Joseph Academy. She moved to Florence in 2014 after the breakup of her marriage to South African diver Grant Jankielsohn, and with the intention of studying art and in order to live near her father, who teaches at an American school in Florence. She was living in an apartment in the Oltrarno neighborhood of Florence when she was murdered.

== Murder, investigation and trial ==
Olsen, 35, was found dead in her apartment in the Santo Spirito neighborhood of Florence by her boyfriend, Florentine artist Federico Fiorentini, on 9 January 2016. Marks on her neck indicated that she had been strangled to death.

Cheik Tidiane Diaw, a 27-year-old Senegalese national who had recently entered Italy as an illegal immigrant, was arrested for the crime. Witnesses saw the two leave a nightclub in Florence together on 7 January. Security cameras in the street recorded them walking to Olsen's apartment in the early hours of 8 January. After identifying Diaw using security camera footage, police called him in for questioning, arresting him based on DNA evidence. Diaw's attorney, Antonio Voce, said that Diaw and Olsen had consumed cocaine and alcohol.

The lead investigator on the case, Giacinto Profazio, was involved in the Meredith Kercher murder case, a case with which Olsen's murder is frequently compared.

On 9 February, reexamination of security tapes by authorities showed that suspect Diaw had returned to the apartment on the night of the murder and spent a period of time inside after his first departure from it.

Prosecutors asked for a life sentence, the highest penalty available in Italy.

=== Perpetrator ===
The murderer, Cheik Diaw, is an immigrant who crossed the border illegally from Senegal and who arrived in Italy in 2015. According to the prosecutor, DNA analysis of a cigarette butt and a condom found by police investigators in Olsen's bathroom led to Diaw's arrest.

Diaw was convicted of murder and sentenced to 30 years in prison.

Attorneys acting for the perpetrator appealed the verdict, but the original 30-year prison sentence was upheld in January 2018.

== See also ==
- Murder of Meredith Kercher
- Murder of Pamela Mastropietro
- Murder of Desirée Mariottini
- Murders of Louisa Vesterager Jespersen and Maren Ueland
- Killing of Shanquella Robinson
