= List of international prime ministerial trips made by Ulf Kristersson =

This is a list of international prime ministerial trips made by Ulf Kristersson, the 35th prime minister of Sweden, who took office on 18 October 2022. Following the 2026 Swedish general election, he announced that he would resign.

== Trips ==
=== Summary ===
As of 19 September 2026, Kristersson has visited 29 countries during his tenure as prime minister. The number of visits per country where Kristersson has traveled are:

- One visit to Egypt, Italy, Moldova, the United Arab Emirates, Japan, Austria, Luxembourg, the Vatican City State, the Netherlands and Cyprus.
- Two visits to Albania, Spain, Iceland, Hungary, Switzerland and Turkey.
- Three visits to Latvia, Lithuania, Ukraine and the United Kingdom.
- Four visits to Estonia, Poland and the United States (USA).
- Five visits to Norway.
- Seven visits to Denmark.
- Eight visits to France and Germany.
- Ten visits to Finland.
- Twenty-five visits to Belgium.

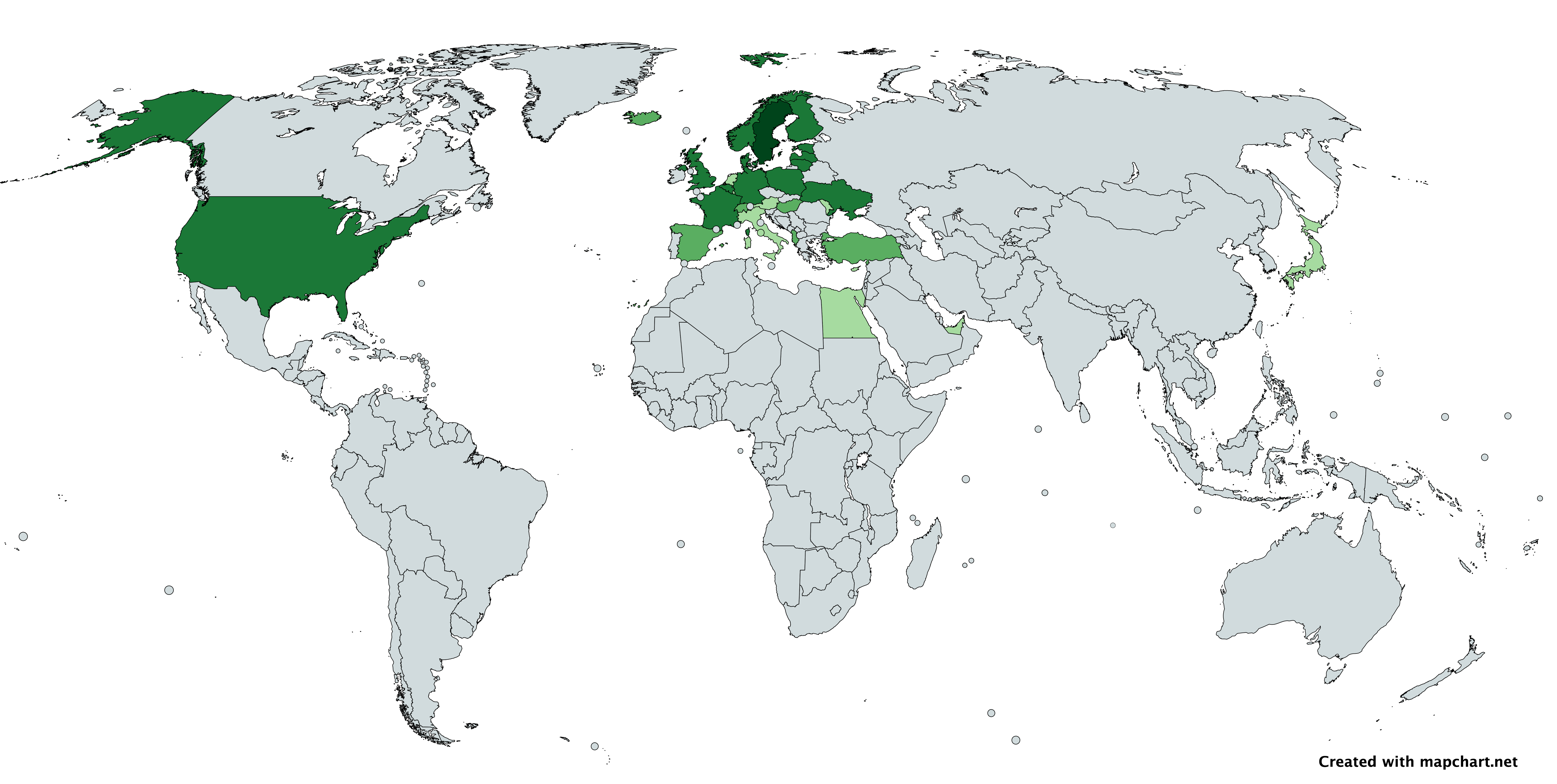
Map of international trips made by Ulf Kristersson as Prime Minister - July 2026: Sweden 3+ visits 2 visits 1 visit

=== 2022 ===
Country	Location(s)	Dates	Details
Belgium	Brussels	20–21 October	Kristersson travelled to Brussels in his first trip outside Sweden as prime minister. He met with NATO Secretary-General Jens Stoltenberg to discuss Sweden's membership application and timeline to join NATO and attended the European Council meeting to discuss the European Union response to the ongoing global energy crisis as well as response to the ongoing Russian invasion of Ukraine and effects caused by the Nord Stream gas leaks.
Finland	Helsinki	28 October	Kristersson travelled to Helsinki in his first bilateral trip as prime minister and met with President Sauli Niinistö and Prime Minister Sanna Marin.
Finland	Helsinki	1 November	Kristersson travelled to Helsinki again and attended the 74th Session of the Nordic Council. He also held bilateral meetings with Prime Minister of Iceland Katrín Jakobsdóttir and Prime Minister of Norway Jonas Gahr Støre.
Egypt	Sharm El Sheikh	7 November	Kristersson attended the 2022 United Nations Climate Change Conference in Sharm El Sheikh and delivered the national address to the conference as well as co-chaired discussions on food supply chains.
Turkey	Ankara	8 November	Kristersson travelled to Ankara to meet with Turkish President Recep Tayyip Erdoğan. They spoke, among other things, about EU-Turkey relations, Sweden's application to join NATO and efforts to combat terrorism.
Albania	Tirana	6 December	Attended EU-Western Balkans summit
Belgium	Brussels	15 December	Kristersson travelled to Brussels to attend the European Council one-day summit. During the summit, they discussed issues related to Russian invasion of Ukraine, sanctions against Russia, financial aid to Ukraine and response to the continuing energy crisis. They also spoke about military defence cooperation of the European Union as well as granted Croatia to join the Schengen area by 1 January 2023.
Latvia	Riga	19 December	Kristersson travelled to Riga to meet with Prime Minister of Latvia Krišjānis Kariņš. He also attended the Joint Expeditionary Force Leaders Summit.

=== 2023 ===
Country	Location(s)	Dates	Details
France	Paris	3 January	Kristersson travelled to Paris to meet with French President Emmanuel Macron.
France	Strasbourg	17 January	Kristersson travelled to Strasbourg to address the European Parliament and to lay out the agenda of Sweden's Presidency of the Council of the European Union.
Estonia	Tallinn	7 February	Kristersson travelled to Tallinn to meet with Estonian President Alar Karis and Estonian Prime Minister Kaja Kallas.
Lithuania	Vilnius	7 February	Kristersson travelled to Vilnius to meet with Lithuanian President Gitanas Nausėda, Lithuanian Prime Minister Ingrida Šimonytė and Seimas speaker Viktorija Čmilytė-Nielsen.
Ukraine	Kyiv	15 February	Kristersson travelled to Kyiv to meet with President of Ukraine Volodymyr Zelenskyy.
Germany	Munich	17–19 February	Kristersson travelled to Munich to attend the 59th Munich Security Conference.
Germany	Berlin	15 March	Kristersson travelled to Berlin to meet with Chancellor of Germany, Olaf Scholz. He also visited the Hertie School where he spoke about a greener, safer and freer Europe and took questions from students.
Belgium	Brussels	20–24 March	Kristersson travelled to Brussels to attend an international donor conference to help people in Turkey and Syria affected by the 2023 Turkey–Syria earthquake on 20 March 2023. He attended the tripartite social summit for growth and employment on 22 March 2023. He then attended the European council meeting 23–24 March 2023, where they discussed the European Unions continued support for Ukraine, but also competitiveness, economy and migration.
Denmark	Birkerød, Lyngby-Tårbæk	25 April	Kristersson travelled to Denmark along with Minister for Migration Maria Malmer Stenergard to meet with Danish prime minister Mette Frederiksen and Danish minister for migration and integration Kaare Dybvad Bek. They visited Hjemresestyrelsen (The Danish Return Agency) and Nationalt ID-center (Danish National ID Centre). They also held meetings at Marienborg addressing migration, asylum policy and the current pressure on the European Unions external border.
Finland	Helsinki	3 May	Kristersson travelled to Finland to meet with Finnish president Sauli Niinistö, Norwegian prime minister Jonas Gahr Støre, Danish prime minister Mette Frederiksen and Icelandic prime minister Katrín Jakobsdóttir. They spoke about security issues, Nordic cooperation and their countries continued strong support for Ukraine. The meeting concluded with a Nordic–Ukrainian summit which was visited by Ukrainian president Volodymyr Zelenskyy.
Moldova	Mimi Castle, Bulboaca, Chișinău	1 June	Kristersson travelled to Moldova to attend the 2nd European Political Community Summit. He also held multilateral talks with Ukrainian president Volodymyr Zelenskyy and five other European countries.
Spain	Madrid	5 June	Kristersson travelled to Spain to meet with Spanish prime minister Pedro Sánchez. He also visited the crisis management center (CITGO) of the Ministry of the Interior.
United Kingdom	London	19 June	Kristersson travelled to London to meet with British prime minister Rishi Sunak. He also visited Google DeepMind, a British artificial intelligence research laboratory launched in April 2023.
Iceland	Vestmannaeyjar	25–26 June	Kristersson travelled to Vestmannaeyjar in Iceland to meet with Nordic prime ministers Katrín Jakobsdóttir (Iceland), Petteri Orpo (Finland), Mette Frederiksen (Denmark) and Jonas Gahr Støre (Norway) as well as Canadian Prime Minister Justin Trudeau and leaders from the Faroe Islands, Greenland and Åland. They discussed security policy, crisis preparedness issues and the green transition.
Belgium	Brussels	29–30 June	Kristersson travelled to Brussels to attend the European Council meeting from 29 to 30 June 2023. They discussed the European Unions continued support for Ukraine, defense and security issues, the future relation between the European Union and China, migration and competitiveness. In connection with the meeting, Kristersson concluded the Swedish presidency of the Council of the European Union.
United States	Washington, D.C.	5 July	Kristersson travelled to Washington, D.C. to meet with President of the United States Joe Biden at the White House. Their meeting focused on Swedens accession to NATO, discussed issues that unite Sweden and the United States in areas such as the green transition, technology issues, continued support for Ukraine and transatlantic relations with China.
Lithuania	Vilnius	10–12 July	Kristersson travelled to Vilnius to attend the 2023 NATO Vilnius summit. He met, among other, with Turkish President Recep Tayyip Erdoğan and NATO Secretary General Jens Stoltenberg, culminating in Erdoğans commitment to ratify Sweden's entry into NATO.
Finland	Helsinki	13 July	Kristersson travelled to Helsinki to attend a meeting between the Nordic Prime Ministers Katrín Jakobsdóttir (Iceland), Petteri Orpo (Finland), Mette Frederiksen (Denmark) and Jonas Gahr Støre (Norway) and United States President Joe Biden.
Belgium	Brussels	17–18 July	Kristersson travelled to Brussels to attend the 3rd EU–CELAC Summit.
United States	New York City	18–21 September	Kristersson travelled to New York City to attend the 78th United Nations General Assembly. He also met with Mayor of New York City Eric Adams.
Spain	Granada	5–6 October	Kristersson attended the 3rd European Political Community Summit on 5 October, where he led a discussion on digital transition and artificial intelligence with Prime Minister of Albania Edi Rama. On 6 October, Kristersson attended the European Council which focused on future European Union enlargement, migration, European resilience and competitiveness.
Belgium	Brussels	18 October	Kristersson travelled to Brussels where he participated in a memorial ceremony for the Swedes who were killed in a terrorist attack on 16 October 2023. Kristersson was invited by Prime Minister of Belgium Alexander De Croo to participate in the ceremony. De Croo also participated in the ceremony. Kristersson also met with Belgian police and prosecutors and visited the Church of Sweden branch in Belgium.
Belgium	Brussels	26–27 October	Kristersson attended the European Council. The meeting focused on Russia's war on Ukraine, migration to the union, the budget of the European Union and the situation in the Middle East.
Norway	Oslo	31 October	Kristersson attended the Nordic Council. He met with the Nordic prime ministers Jonas Gahr Støre (Norway), Katrín Jakobsdóttir (Iceland), Mette Frederiksen (Denmark) and Petteri Orpo (Finland) as well as with Aksel V. Johannesen (Faroe Islands), Múte Bourup Egede (Greenland) and Veronica Thörnroos (Åland Islands). Kristersson also laid out Swedens agenda for their 2024 Presidency of the Nordic Council of Ministers.
Denmark	Copenhagen	14 November	Kristersson travelled to Copenhagen to meet with prime ministers Mette Frederiksen (Denmark), Petteri Orpo (Finland), Leo Varadkar (Ireland), Nikolay Denkov (Bulgaria) and Evika Siliņa (Latvia).
Finland	Helsinki	27 November	Kristersson travelled along with Foreign Minister Tobias Billström, Defence Minister Pål Jonson and national security advisor Henrik Landerholm to Helsinki to meet with their Finnish counterparts.
United Arab Emirates	Dubai	1–2 December	Kristersson attended the 2023 United Nations Climate Change Conference in Dubai. He delivered the national speech, participated in events that emphasized the role of nuclear power in reaching the climate goals, participated in the launch of partnerships for the phasing out of emissions from heavy industry within the framework of LeadIT, and inaugurated the Swedish pavilion.
Belgium	Brussels	14–15 December	Kristersson attended the European Council. The council opened accession negotiations with Ukraine and Moldova and granted Georgia with candidate status. The council also discussed the Budget of the European Union, the current events and situation in the Middle East and other security and defense issues. Kristersson also met with Western Balkan leaders.

=== 2024 ===
Country	Location(s)	Dates	Details
Belgium	Brussels	1 February	Kristersson attended the Special European Council Summit. The summit greenlitted additional funding for the multiannual financial framework 2021-2027 and discussed support for Ukraine, the situation in the Middle East and European agriculture, and paid tribute to former European Commission president Jacques Delors who died on 27 December 2023.
Poland	Warsaw	20 February	Kristersson met with Polish Prime Minister Donald Tusk. They discussed continued support for Ukraine and the fight against international organized crime among other things. He also met with Polish President Andrzej Duda and Poland's special representative for the reconstruction of Ukraine to discuss investments in Ukraine.
Belgium	Brussels	22 February	Kristersson met with President of the European Commission Ursula von der Leyen and President of the European Council Charles Michel.
Hungary	Budapest	23 February	Kristersson travelled to Budapest to meet with Hungarian Prime Minister Viktor Orban. They discussed security and defense policy cooperation between Hungary and Sweden, preparations for Hungary's upcoming presidency of the Council of the European Union and the unions strategic agenda.
United States	Washington, D.C.	7 March	Kristersson travelled to Washington, D.C. to deposit Sweden's Instrument of Accession to NATO, making Sweden a full member of NATO. Later on that same day, Kristersson attended the 2024 State of the Union Address.
Belgium	Brussels	11 March	Kristersson travelled to Brussels to attend the ceremony in which Sweden's flag was raised at NATO headquarters.
Belgium	Brussels	21–22 March	Kristersson travelled to Brussels to attend the European Council. The council discussed topics such as military support Ukraine, the Common Security and Defence Policy, the continuing development in the Middle East and decided to begin formal negotiations on the accession of Bosnia and Hercegovina to the European Union.
Lithuania	Vilnius	2 April	Kristersson travelled to Vilnius to attend a working dinner on the invitation of Lithuanian President Gitanas Nauseda and President of the European Council Charles Michel. The dinner focused on European future issues such as European Union Aid to Ukraine, potential enlargement of the European Union, competitiveness and migration and asylum policy. Czech Prime Minister Petr Fiala, Dutch Prime Minister Mark Rutte and Croatian Prime Minister Andrej Plenković were among others that attended the dinner.
Belgium	Brussels	17–18 April	Kristersson attended an extraordinary European Council summit. The meeting focused on the European Unions long-term policy on competitiveness. The council also discussed recent developments in the Middle East, European Union–Turkey relations and Russia's war in Ukraine.
Latvia	Riga	11 June	Kristersson attended a meeting with the Bucharest Nine (Bulgaria, the Czech Republic, Estonia, Hungary, Latvia, Lithuania, Poland, Romania and Slovakia). They discussed the upcoming 2024 Washington NATO summit and the long-term support for Ukraine.
Belgium	Brussels	17 June	Kristersson attended an informal European Council meeting. The meeting focused on high-level appointments as a result of the recently held 2024 European Parliament elections.
Norway	Bodø	18–19 June	Kristersson travelled to Bodø with Defence Minister Pål Jonson to meet with Norwegian prime minister Jonas Gahr Støre and Finnish president Alexander Stubb ahed of the 2024 Washington NATO summit.
Belgium	Brussels	27–28 June	Kristersson attended the European Council summit. The council nominated Ursula von der Leyen for a second term as President of the European Commission and discussed the unions strategic agenda and priorities for the 2024–2029 period with the adoption of a roadmap for internal reforms. They also discussed continued efforts to support Ukraine during Russia's war on the country and focused on the development in the Middle East, the unions defense capabilities and defense industry, competitiveness, relations to Georgia, migration and hybrid threats.
United States	Washington, D.C.	9–11 July	Kristersson travelled to Washington, D.C. to attend the 2024 Washington summit (NATO).
France	Paris	31 August	Kristersson travelled to Paris to attend the 2024 Summer Paralympics.
Belgium	Brussels	16–18 October	Kristersson travelled to Brussels and attended, along with Belgian Prime Minister Alexander De Croo, the commemoration ceremony on the anniversary of the terrorist attack in Brussels where two Swedish football supporters where killed in 2023. He also met with new NATO Secretary-General Mark Rutte. Prior to attending the summit of the European Council, he and other head of governments of the union met with leaders of the Gulf Cooperation Council. The council's summit later discussed topics such as strengthening the support for Ukraine and further efforts to reduce illegal migration to the union.
Iceland	Reykjavík	28–30 October	Kristersson travelled to Reykjavík to attend the 76th session of the Nordic Council. The head of governments of the council met with Ukrainian President Volodymyr Zelenskyy and signed a Nordic-Ukrainian declaration, focusing on among other things on industrial defence cooperation. Kristersson also signed a Nordic declaration, focusing on speeding up work on making the Nordic countries the most integrated and sustainable region in the world by 2030.
Denmark	Copenhagen	30 October	Kristersson travelled to Copenhagen to meet with Danish Prime Minister Mette Frederiksen. Together they visited a preschool to study mandatory special language learning programs in preschools for children living in vulnerable areas.
Hungary	Budapest	7–8 November	Kristersson travelled to Budapest to attend the 5th European Political Community Summit and an informal meeting with the European Council. The European council discussed the situation in Ukraine, the European Union's competitiveness, the situation in Georgia and the transatlantic relationship.
Japan	Tokyo	3–7 December	Kristersson travelled to Japan along with Deputy Prime Minister and Minister for Energy, Business and Industry Ebba Busch, Minister for Defence Pål Jonson, Minister for Foreign Trade and International Development Cooperation Benjamin Dousa and representatives of Swedish companies. The delegation met with representatives of the Japanese governments, including Prime Minister of Japan Shigeru Ishiba, business representatives and participated in activities for the promotion of Swedish business. He also gave e a speech at Keio University in Tokyo. The delegation was to travel to South Korea following their visit to Japan; the trip was cancelled due to events related to the 2024 South Korean martial law.
France	Paris	7 December	Kristersson attended the reopening of Notre-Dame de Paris, following the Notre-Dame fire in 2019, on the invitation of the President of France Emmanuel Macron.
Estonia	Tallinn	16–17 December	Kristersson attended a meeting within the framework of the regional defense cooperation Joint Expeditionary Force (JEF).
Belgium	Brussels	19 December	Kristersson attended the European Council. The council focused on Ukraine and the Middle East, the European Union's role in the world, the union's preparedness and crisis management capabilities, and migration.
Finland	Region of Lapland	21–22 December	Kristersson travelled to northern Finland on the invitation of Finnish Prime Minister Petteri Orpo. He attended an informal meeting with Orpo, Greek Prime Minister Kyriakos Mitsotakis, Italian Prime Minister Giorgia Meloni and the High Representative of the Union for Foreign Affairs and Security Policy Kaja Kallas.

=== 2025 ===
Country	Location(s)	Dates	Details
Austria	Vienna	1–2 January	Kristersson travelled to Vienna to meet with Austrian chancellor Karl Nehammer, Austrian president Alexander Van der Bellen, Austrian integration minister Susanne Raab and European Commissioner for Internal Affairs and Migration Magnus Brunner.
Germany	Berlin	17 January	Kristersson travelled to Berlin to meet with German chancellor Olaf Scholz. They discussed security policy issues, migration, and European competitiveness. He also met with leader of the opposition and leader of the Christian Democratic Union, Friedrich Merz.
Switzerland	Davos	21–22 January	Kristersson travelled to Davos to attend the 55th World Economic Forum.
Denmark	Copenhagen	26 January	Kristersson travelled to Copenhagen for an informal dinner with Danish prime minister Mette Frederiksen, Norwegian Prime Minister Jonas Gahr Støre and Finnish President Alexander Stubb.
Poland	Oświęcim	27 January	Kristersson travelled to Oświęcim to attend a ceremony commemorating the 80th anniversary of the liberation of Auschwitz concentration camp.
Latvia	Riga	7 February	Kristersson travelled to Riga to mark the commencement of Sweden's first deployed NATO force in Latvia, on a rotation for approximately six months, as part of the NATO Enhanced Forward Presence.
France	Paris	10–11 February	Kristersson travelled to Paris to attend the 3rd AI Safety Summit.
Germany	Munich	14–16 February	Kristersson travelled to Munich to attend the 61st Munich Security Conference.
Ukraine	Kyiv	24–25 February	Kristersson travelled to Kyiv in connection with a meeting to mark three years since the start of the Russian invasion of Ukraine. He met with President Volodymyr Zelenskyy and other national leaders who also attended the meeting. They reiterated their full support for Ukraine in its right to national sovereignty. On his way home, the train from Kyiv to the Polish border was delayed by Russian missile attacks on Lviv.
Italy	Rome	26 February	Kristersson travelled to Rome and met with Italian Prime Minister Giorgia Meloni. They signed a letter of understanding on migration cooperation; Sweden joined Meloni's initiative "The Rome Process” on migration.
Germany	Berlin	26 February	After his visit to Rome, Kristersson travelled to Berlin and met with the presumptive next German chancellor Friedrich Merz. They held talks on strengthened competitiveness, the European Union's priorities and continued support for Ukraine.
United Kingdom	London	2 March	Kristersson travelled to London to attend a meeting of European leaders on the invitation of Prime Minister of the United Kingdom Keir Starmer. The meeting focused on increasing support for Ukraine, increased national defense spending on a European level, possible paths for a peace agreement between Ukraine and Russia and the future role of the United States in European security policy.
Belgium	Brussels	6 March	Kristersson travelled to Brussels to attend an extraordinary session of the European Council. The council focused on the unions continued support for Ukraine and European defense policy.
Luxembourg	Luxembourg	19 March	Kristersson travelled to Luxembourg to meet with Luxembourg prime minister Luc Frieden. He also met with president of the European Investment Bank (EIB), Nadia Calviño, and the vice-president, Thomas Östros. Later that same day, he was received in an audience by His Royal Highness Guillaume, Hereditary Grand Duke of Luxembourg.
Belgium	Brussels	20–21 March	Kristersson attended the European Council.
France	Paris	27 March	Kristersson attended a meeting of the "Coalition of the willing" hosted by President Macron.
Vatican City State	Vatican City	26 April	Kristersson attended the funeral of Pope Francis.
Norway	Oslo	8–9 May	Kristersson attended a meeting of the Joint Expeditionary Force (JEF) in Oslo.
United Kingdom	London	12 May	Kristersson travelled to London to meet with Prime Minister Keir Starmer for a bilateral meeting. They discussed topics such as defense cooperation and the countries' joint support for Ukraine.
Albania	Tirana	16 May	Kristersson attended the 6th European Political Community Summit.
Finland	Turku	26–27 May	Kristersson travalled to Turku to meet with Nordic prime ministers Kristrún Frostadóttir (Iceland), Petteri Orpo (Finland), Mette Frederiksen (Denmark) and Jonas Gahr Støre (Norway) as well as German chancellor Friedrich Merz and leaders from the Faroe Islands (Aksel V. Johannesen), Greenland (Jens-Frederik Nielsen) and Åland (Katrin Sjögren).
Netherlands	The Hague	24–25 June	Kristersson attended the 2025 NATO summit.
Belgium	Brussels	26–27 June	Kristersson attended the European Council.
Denmark	Copenhagen	3 September	Met with Prime Minister Mette Frederiksen, President Volodymyr Zelenskyy and other leaders. Attended the Nordic-Baltic Eight summit.
Denmark	Copenhagen	1–2 October	Kristersson attended an informal meeting with the European Council and the 7th European Political Community Summit.
Belgium	Brussels	23–24 October	Kristersson attended the European Council.
Estonia	Tallinn	6 November	Kristersson met with Prime Minister of Estonia Kristen Michal.
Germany	Berlin	19 November	Kristersson met with Chancellor of Germany Friedrich Merz and attended the 2025 Berlin Security Conference.
Finland	Helsinki	1–2 December	Kristersson met with Prime Minister of Finland Petteri Orpo. The focus of the meeting was the follow-up to the joint government meeting that took place in Stockholm in 2024. In connection with the meeting, the prime ministers also inaugurated two works of art at the Hanasaari Swedish-Finnish cultural centre.
Germany	Berlin	15 December	Kristersson met several European leaders, including Ukrainian president Volodymyr Zelenskyj, gathered for a summit in Berlin focused on the peace talks on Ukraine.
Finland	Helsinki	16 December	Kristersson attended the Eastern Flank Summit with Finland, Estonia, Latvia, Poland, Bulgaria, Romania, and Lithuania.

=== 2026 ===
Country	Location(s)	Dates	Details
France	Paris	6 January	Kristersson travelled to Paris to attend a meeting with heads of state and government within the Coalition of the Willing.
Switzerland	Davos	20–21 January	Kristersson travelled to Davos and attended the 56th World Economic Forum.
Belgium	Brussels	22 January	Kristersson travelled to Brussels to attend an extra ordinary summit with the European Council.
Belgium	Rijkhoven (Alden Biesen)	12 February	Kristersson travelled to Rijkhoven to attend an informal summit with the European Council.
Germany	Munich	13–15 February	Kristersson attended the 62nd Munich Security Conference.
Ukraine	Kyiv	24 February	Kristersson travelled to Kyiv to meet President Volodymyr Zelenskyy and join Nordic-Baltic leaders in the coalition of the willing to mark the fourth anniversary of Russia’s full-scale invasion.
Norway	Oslo	15 March	Kristersson attended an Nordic-Canadian summit in Olso and met with Nordic leaders and Canadian Prime Minister Mark Carney.
Belgium	Brussels	19–20 March	Kristersson attended the European Council.
Finland	Helsinki	26 March	Kristersson attended the Joint Expeditionary Force Leaders Summit.
Cyprus	Nicosia	23–24 April	Kristersson attended the European Council in Nicosia during the 2026 Cypriot Presidency of the Council of the European Union.
Estonia	Tallinn	9 June	Kristersson attended NB8 Prime Ministers’ Meeting.
Belgium	Brussels	18–19 June	Kristersson attended the European Council.
Poland	Gdańsk	25 June	Kristersson attended the Eastern Flank Summit in Gdańsk to discuss strengthening the EU’s eastern flank in response to the threat from Russia.
Poland	Gdynia	29 June	Kristersson visited Gdynia for government-level talks as Poland announced the purchase of three Saab A26 submarines, further strengthening Swedish-Polish cooperation on security and defence.
Turkey	Ankara	7–8 July	Kristersson attended the 2026 Ankara NATO summit.
France	Paris	13 July	Kristersson travelled to Paris to attend a meeting with heads of state and government within the Coalition of the Willing.
Denmark	Copenhagen	20 August	Kristersson met with Nordic prime ministers in Copenhagen at the invitation of Danish Prime Minister Mette Frederiksen and Faroese Prime Minister Beinir Johannesen.
Norway	Oslo	9 September	Kristersson attended the state funeral of Harald V.
Belgium	Brussels	15–16 October	Kristersson attended the European Council.
Finland	Helsinki	27 October	Kristersson attended the Nordic Council session in Helsinki and met with Prime Ministers Petteri Orpo, Mette Fredriksen, Jonas Gahr Støre, Kristrún Frostadóttir, Jens-Frederik Nielsen and Beinir Johannesen.
Denmark	Copenhagen	10 November	Kristersson travelled to Copenhagen to attend a meeting with the Nordic heads of state and government and Ukrainian President Volodymyr Zelenskyy. The discussions focused on military assistance to Ukraine, European security, and Ukraine's urgent need for air defence and protection of its energy infrastructure.
Ireland	Dublin	12–13 November	Kristersson travelled to Dublin to attend the 9th European Political Community Summit and an informal meeting of the European Council. The European Council discussions focused on artificial intelligence, particularly its impact on European competitiveness and society.

== Future trips ==
The following international trips are scheduled to be made by Ulf Kristersson:

Country	Location(s)	Date	Details

== Multilateral meetings ==
Ulf Kristersson participated in the following summits during his premiership:

Group	Year				
Group	2022	2023	2024	2025	2026
UNGA		22 September, (United States) New York City	22 September^{[a]}, (United States) New York City	25 September^{[a]}, (United States) New York City	25 September^{[a]}, (United States) New York City
NATO		11–12 July, (Lithuania) Vilnius	9–11 July, (United States) Washington, D.C.	24–25 June, (Netherlands) The Hague	7–8 July, (Turkey) Ankara
EU–CELAC	None	17–18 July, (Belgium) Brussels	None	9–10 November, (Colombia) Santa Marta	None
EPC		1 June, (Moldova) Bulboaca	18 July, (United Kingdom) Woodstock	16 May, (Albania) Tirana	4 May, (Armenia) Yerevan
EPC		5 October, (Spain) Granada	7 November, (Hungary) Budapest	2 October, (Denmark) Copenhagen	12 November, (Republic of Ireland)
COP	6–7 November (Egypt) Sharm El Sheikh	1 December (United Arab Emirates) Dubai	12 November, (Azerbaijan) Baku	10 November, (Brazil) Belém	9–20 November, (Turkey) Antalya
JEF	19 December, (Latvia) Riga	12–13 October, (Sweden) Visby	16–17 December, (Estonia) Tallinn	9 May, (Norway) Oslo	26 March, (Finland) Helsinki
Others	None	None	Bucharest Nine; 11 June (Latvia) Riga	Securing our future 2 March, (United Kingdom) London	Together for peace and security summit 6 January, (France) Paris
Others	None	None	Global Peace Summit; 15–16 June (Switzerland) Lucerne	15 March, (videoconference); United Kingdom	Determined to act 13 July, (France) Paris
Others	None	None	Global Peace Summit; 15–16 June (Switzerland) Lucerne	Building a robust peace for Ukraine and Europe; 27 March, (France) Paris	Determined to act 13 July, (France) Paris
██ = Future event ██ = Did not attend / participate.^aMinister for Foreign Affairs Maria Malmer Stenergard attended in the prime minister's place.

== See also ==
- Foreign relations of Sweden
- List of international prime ministerial trips made by Magdalena Andersson
- List of international trips made by Tobias Billström as Minister for Foreign Affairs of Sweden
- List of international trips made by Maria Malmer Stenergard as Minister for Foreign Affairs of Sweden
- List of state visits made by Carl XVI Gustaf
