= MedTech World =

Malta-based medical technology and health technology organisation

- Founded: 2020
- Founder: Dr. Dylan Attard
- Type: Private
- Purpose: Medical technology, healthcare innovation, events
- Location: Valletta, Malta
- Region served: Worldwide
- Key people: Dr. Dylan Attard (Co-Founder & CEO)
- Website: med-tech.world

MedTech World (formerly Med-Tech World) is a Malta-based organisation operating in the medical technology and health technology sector. It runs international summits, investor forums, startup pitch competitions, and media publications in the healthcare innovation space. The organisation was founded in 2020 by Dr. Dylan Attard, a Maltese surgeon, and has since expanded its activities across Europe, North America, the Middle East, and Asia-Pacific.

== History ==
MedTech World was established in 2020 in Malta by Dr. Dylan Attard, who had graduated from the University of Malta medical school in 2017 and subsequently worked in surgery before transitioning to entrepreneurship. The organisation's first summit was held entirely online during the COVID-19 pandemic, positioning the platform from the outset as a global ecosystem rather than a local conference. The stated founding mission was to connect the Maltese MedTech ecosystem with the broader European and international healthcare technology market.

In 2021, MedTech World held its first in-person event at the Hilton Hotel in Malta, bringing the global community together physically for the first time. The following year, the event’s main summit was held at the historic Mediterranean Conference Centre in Valletta (Malta), a venue that has hosted multiple international conferences, reflecting the event’s expanded international participation and scale. In 2022, the organisation also launched an international roadshow series, with early legs in Dubai, Toronto, and Belgrade, framing Malta's annual summit as the culmination of a year-long global tour.

Between 2022 and 2025, MedTech World extended its reach across multiple continents, hosting conferences and satellite events in cities including The Hague, London, Houston, San Jose, Singapore, and Hong Kong.

In 2024, the organisation dropped the hyphen from its name, rebranding from Med-Tech World to MedTech World and introducing an updated visual identity and logo. In June 2025, the organisation and MedTech Innovator, a large accelerator for medical device, digital health, and diagnostic startups, jointly hosted a showcase in the Bay Area, California, where about 100 selected startups presented to investors and industry representatives.

In 2026, MedTech World planned a four-continent summit series, with events scheduled in Dubai, West Palm Beach, Hong Kong, and Valletta. The series was described as a platform for connecting health innovators with investors and industry peers across multiple regions.

== Activities ==
MedTech World hosts an annual startup pitch competition at its flagship Malta summit, where early‑stage companies present to industry attendees and investors as part of the broader event programme. The Dubai edition of the summit targets over 300 chief executives, 70 speakers, 100 investors, and 50 startup founders per event.

Core thematic areas include early-stage and scaling medical device innovation, Software as a Medical Device (SaMD), digital health technologies, and cross-border investment and regulatory dialogue. MedTech World has collaborated with entities including the Malta Digital Innovation Authority, Malta Enterprise, the Malta Medicines Authority, and VisitMalta, as well as with international accelerators and investment groups.

MedTech World supports the SiGMA Foundation, which works across education, community development, and healthcare access in emerging markets.
