= Malta declaration =

Malta declaration may refer to:

- Malta Declaration (EU), a declaration made in Malta on 3 February 2017 during the European migrant crisis by leaders of the European Union
- Malta declaration (International Intersex Forum), a statement of the Third International Intersex Forum, which took place in Valletta, Malta, in 2013
- The World Medical Association Declaration of Malta on hunger strikes, 1991
