= Prague Process =

Prague Process may refer to:

- Prague Process (Armenian–Azerbaijani negotiations)
- Prague Declaration on European Conscience and Communism
- Prague Process (co-operation in migration management)
