= Valletta Summit on Migration =

Summit held in Malta

Coordinates: 35°53′58.2″N 14°31′4.8″E

Valletta Summit on Migration Valletta Conference on Migration
- Logo of the Valletta Summit
- Host country: Malta
- Date: 11–12 November 2015
- Cities: Valletta
- Venues: Mediterranean Conference Centre
- Website: consilium.europa.eu

Key points
- European migrant crisis

The Valletta Summit on Migration, also called the Valletta Conference on Migration, was a summit held in Valletta, Malta, on 11–12 November 2015, in which European and African leaders discussed the European migrant crisis. The summit resulted in the EU setting up an Emergency Trust Fund to promote development in Africa, in return for African countries to help out in the crisis.

The summit was held at three venues in Valletta. The opening ceremony was held at Auberge de Castille, while the Mediterranean Conference Centre hosted the main conference. Fort Saint Elmo was used as a media centre. The summit was the largest one ever hosted in Malta, with around 4,000 people attending. The summit was held a few weeks before the Commonwealth Heads of Government Meeting 2015, which was also held in Malta.

== Background ==
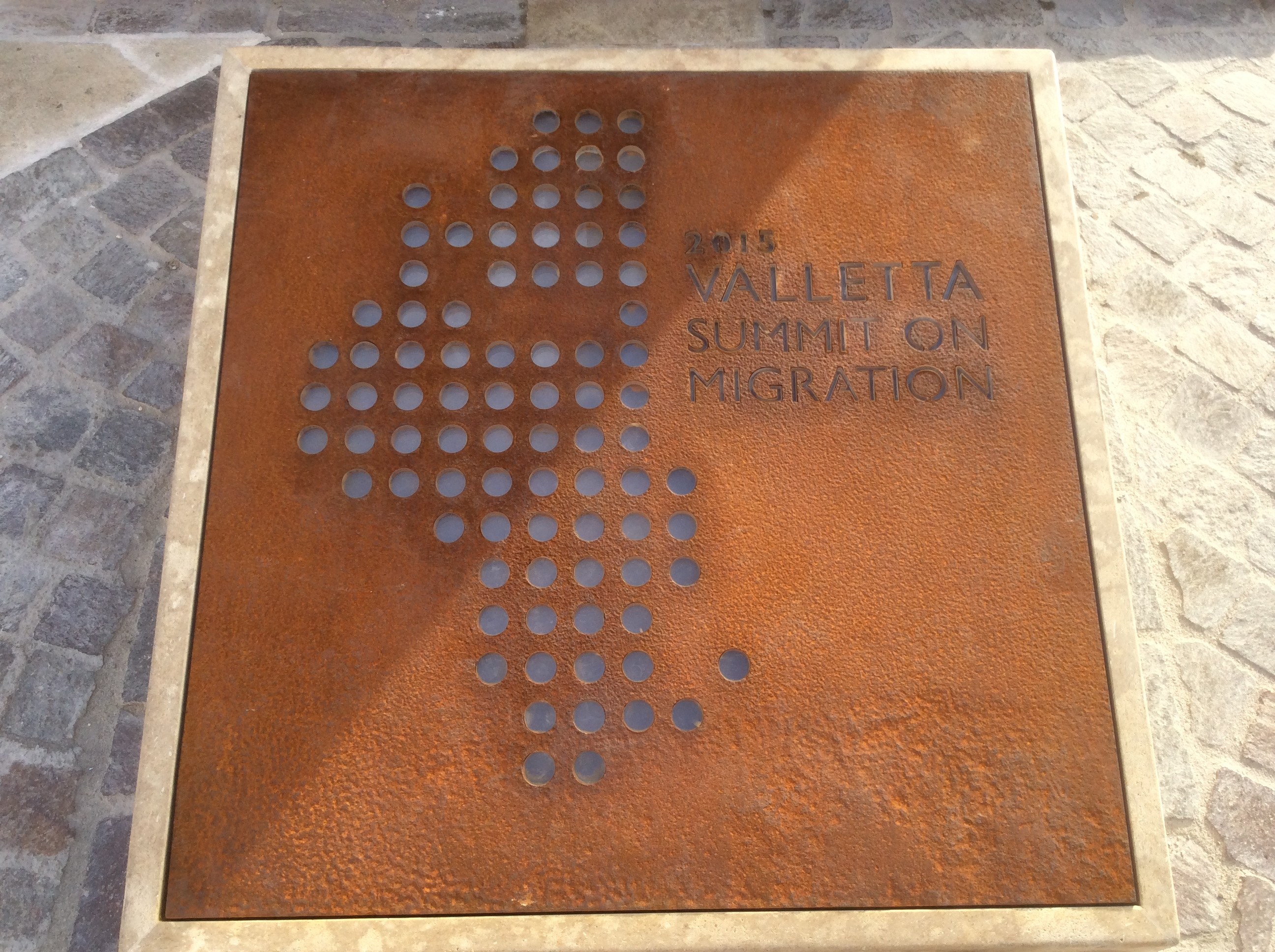
Plaque commemorating the 2015 Summit Meeting on Migration under the Knot Monument

The European migrant crisis began when large numbers of migrants and refugees from various countries came to the European Union and applied for asylum. The term "crisis" has been widely used since April 2015, when a number of boats carrying migrants sank in the Mediterranean Sea, resulting in the deaths of around 1,200 people. Following the shipwreck of 19 April, the European Council held a meeting to discuss the situation of migrants in the Mediterranean Sea. Among the decisions made during this meeting, EU leaders agreed to increase dialogue with the African Union and other countries involved in the migrant crisis by holding a summit in Valletta, Malta.

The summit was meant to include leaders of the countries of origin, transit or destination of the migrants. The heads of state and government of EU member states, the African Union Commission, the ECOWAS Commission, and states parties to the Khartoum Process and the Rabat Process were all invited to the summit, as were the Secretary-General of the United Nations and representatives from the International Organization for Migration.

== The summit ==
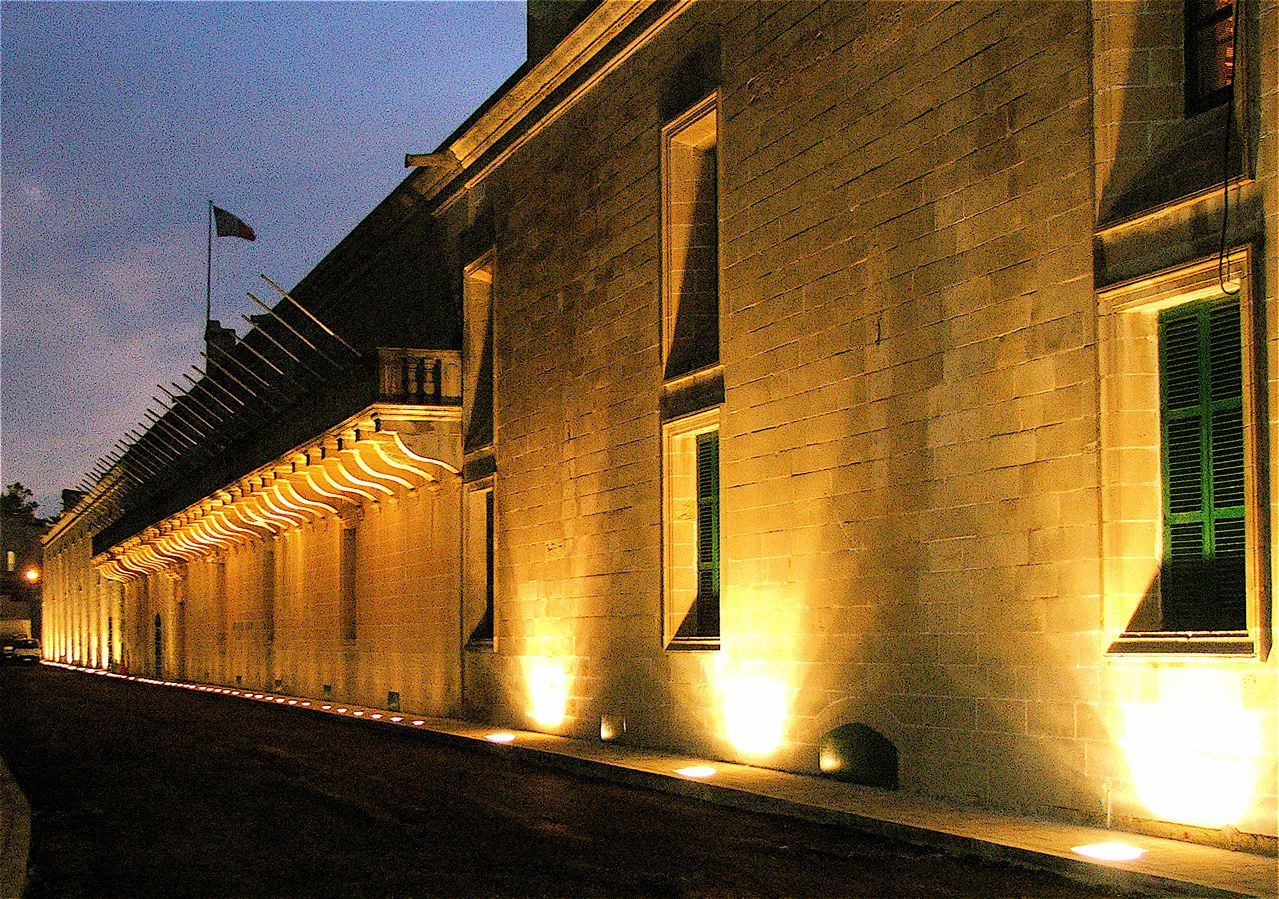
The summit was held at the Mediterranean Conference Centre in Valletta, Malta.

The Valletta Summit began with an opening ceremony in front of Auberge de Castille, the Office of the Prime Minister of Malta. A monument was unveiled for the occasion. After the ceremony was over, the leaders were transferred to the Mediterranean Conference Centre.

The summit itself began at 6:30 p.m. with a speech by Maltese Prime Minister Joseph Muscat. On the first day, the leaders discussed a situation in which African countries would help to reduce migration across the Mediterranean, with the EU giving Africans better access to Europe in return. According to Muscat, the meeting was "less confrontational than expected".

On 12 November, the European and African leaders signed an agreement to set up an Emergency Trust Fund to help development in African countries as well as to encourage those countries to take back migrants who arrived in Europe. The fund pledged €1.8 billion in aid, with other development assistance of €20 billion every year. The leaders also pledged action to improve the situation in the Horn of Africa, the Sahel, Lake Chad and other parts of Africa to reduce the flow of refugees. They also promised to promote regular migration channels and implement policies for integrating migrants into society.

The summit ended with a Final Declaration and an Action Plan. Donald Tusk, the President of the European Council, said that the migrant crisis was a "race against time" to save the Schengen Agreement.

== Aftermath ==
An informal summit of EU leaders was held just after the Valletta Summit ended. The key points discussed included the threat to the Schengen Area, securing Europe's external border and relations with Turkey.

In July 2016, Minister for Home Affairs and National Security Carmelo Abela announced that the Maltese government is planning a follow-up meeting to the Valletta Summit.

== Participants ==
The leaders who took part in the Valletta Summit are listed in the table below. Sudan was represented by its foreign minister as President Omar al-Bashir could not travel to Malta due to an international arrest warrant. Poland was only represented by an undersecretary of state due to a clash with the first sitting of the country's new parliament.

Countries
Member	Represented by	Title
Albania	Edi Rama	Prime Minister
Algeria	Abdelmalek Sellal	Prime Minister
Austria	Werner Faymann	Chancellor
Belgium	Charles Michel	Prime Minister
Benin	Thomas Boni Yayi	President
Bosnia and Herzegovina-	Dragan Covic	Chairman of the Presidency
Botswana	Ian Khama	President
Bulgaria	Rosen Plevneliev	President
Burkina Faso	Michel Kafando	President
Burundi	Pierre Nkurunziza	President
Cabo Verde	Jorge Carlos Fonseca	President
Central African Republic	Daniel Emery Dede	Ambassador to the European Union
Chad	Idriss Déby	President
Congo	Jean-Claude Gakosso	Minister of Foreign Affairs
Côte d'Ivoire	Alassane Ouattara	President
Croatia	Vesna Pusić	Deputy Prime Minister
Cyprus	Socrates Chasikos	Minister for Interior
Czech Republic	Milos Zeman	President
Denmark	Lars Løkke Rasmussen	Prime Minister
Djibouti	Hassan Omar Mohamed Bourhano	Minister for Interior
Egypt	Sameh Shoukry	Minister for Foreign Affairs
Equatorial Guinea	Teodoro Obiang Nguema Mbasogo	President
Eritrea	Osman Saleh Mohammed	Minister for Foreign Affairs
Estonia	Taavi Rõivas	Prime Minister
Ethiopia	Hailemariam Desalegn	Prime Minister
Finland	Sauli Niinistö	President
France	François Hollande	President
Gabon	Ali Bongo Ondimba	President
Gambia	Abdoulie Jose	Trade Minister
Germany	Angela Merkel	Chancellor
Ghana	John Dramani Mahama	President
Greece	Alexis Tsipras	Prime Minister
Guinea	Alpha Condé	President
Guinea-Bissau	Suzi Carla Barbosa	Minister for Cooperation
Hungary	Viktor Orbán	Prime Minister
Iceland	Sigmundur Davíð Gunnlaugsson	Prime Minister
Ireland	Frances Fitzgerald	Minister for Justice and Equality
Italy	Matteo Renzi	Prime Minister
Kenya	Joseph Ole Nkaissery	Secretary General
Latvia	Edgars Rinkēvičs	Minister for Foreign Affairs
Liberia	Joseph Boakai	Vice President
Libya	Abdourhman A. M. Alahirish	Deputy Prime Minister
Lithuania	Dalia Grybauskaitė	President
Luxembourg	Xavier Bettel	Prime Minister
Mali	Ibrahim Boubacar Keïta	President
Malta	Joseph Muscat	Prime Minister
Mauritania	Abdalla Ahmedou	Minister for Foreign Affairs and Cooperation
Monaco	Albert II	Prince
Montenegro	Filip Vujanovic	President
Morocco	Salaheddine Mezouar	Minister for Foreign Affairs
Netherlands	Mark Rutte	Prime Minister
Niger	Mahamadou Issoufou	President
Nigeria	Abubakar Gusau Magaji	Minister for Defence
Norway	Erna Solberg	Prime Minister
Poland	Katarzyna Kacperczyk	Undersecretary of State
Portugal	Pedro Passos Coelho	Prime Minister
Romania	Klaus Iohannis	President
Rwanda	Paul Kagame	President of Rwanda
Senegal	Macky Sall	President
Sierra Leone	Samura Kamara	Foreign Minister
Slovakia	Andrej Kiska	President
Slovenia	Miro Cerar	Prime Minister
Somalia	Omar Abdirashid Ali Sharmarke	Prime Minister
South Sudan	Salva Kiir	President
Spain	Mariano Rajoy	Prime Minister
Sudan	Ibrahim Ghandour	Minister of Foreign Affairs
Sweden	Stefan Löfven	Prime Minister
Switzerland	Simonetta Sommaruga	President
Togo	Komlan Edo Robert Dussey	Minister of Foreign Affairs, Cooperation and African Integration
Tunisia	Habib Essid	Prime Minister
Turkey	Recep Tayyip Erdogan	President
United Kingdom	David Cameron	Prime Minister

Organizations
Member	Represented by	Title
(European Union) European Council	Donald Tusk	President
(European Union) European Commission	Jean-Claude Juncker	President
(European Union) European Parliament	Martin Schulz	President
African Union Commission	Nkosazana Dlamini-Zuma	Chairperson
Economic Community of West African States	Kadré Désiré Ouedraogo	President
(European Union) Justice and Home Affairs Council	Jean Asselborn	Chairman/Minister
(European Union) European External Action Service	Federica Mogherini	High Representative
(European Union) European Commission	Neven Mimica	European Commissioner for International Cooperation and Development
Council of the European Union	Jeppe Tranholm-Mikkelsen	Secretary General
(European Union) European Asylum Support Office	José Carreira	Executive Director ad interim
United Nations Secretariat	Jan Eliasson	Deputy Secretary General
United Nations Secretariat	Peter Sutherland	Special Representative of the Secretary General for Migration and Development
United Nations Development Programme	Helen Clark	Administrator
United Nations High Commissioner for Refugees	António Guterres	High Commissioner
Union for the Mediterranean	Fathallah Sijilmassi	Secretary General
Europol	Oldřich Martinů	Deputy Director of Governance
Frontex	Hendrik Weijermans	Head of External Relations
International Centre for Migration Policy Development	Michael Spindelegger	Director General
Intergovernmental Authority on Development	Fathia Alouan	
Interpol	Jürgen Stock	Secretary General
International Federation of Red Cross and Red Crescent Societies	Garry Conille	Under Sec. Gen. Programme and Operation
International Organization for Migration	William L. Swing	Director General
Arab League	Talal Shubailat	Ambassador, League of Arab States Representative
Organisation internationale de la Francophonie	Michaëlle Jean	Secretary General
Sovereign Military Order of Malta	Stefano Ronca	Diplomatic Counsellor to the Grand Chancellor
Norwegian Refugee Council	Valerie Ceccherini	EU Advocacy Adviser
MADE AFRICA	Odile Faye	Coordinator

== Monument ==
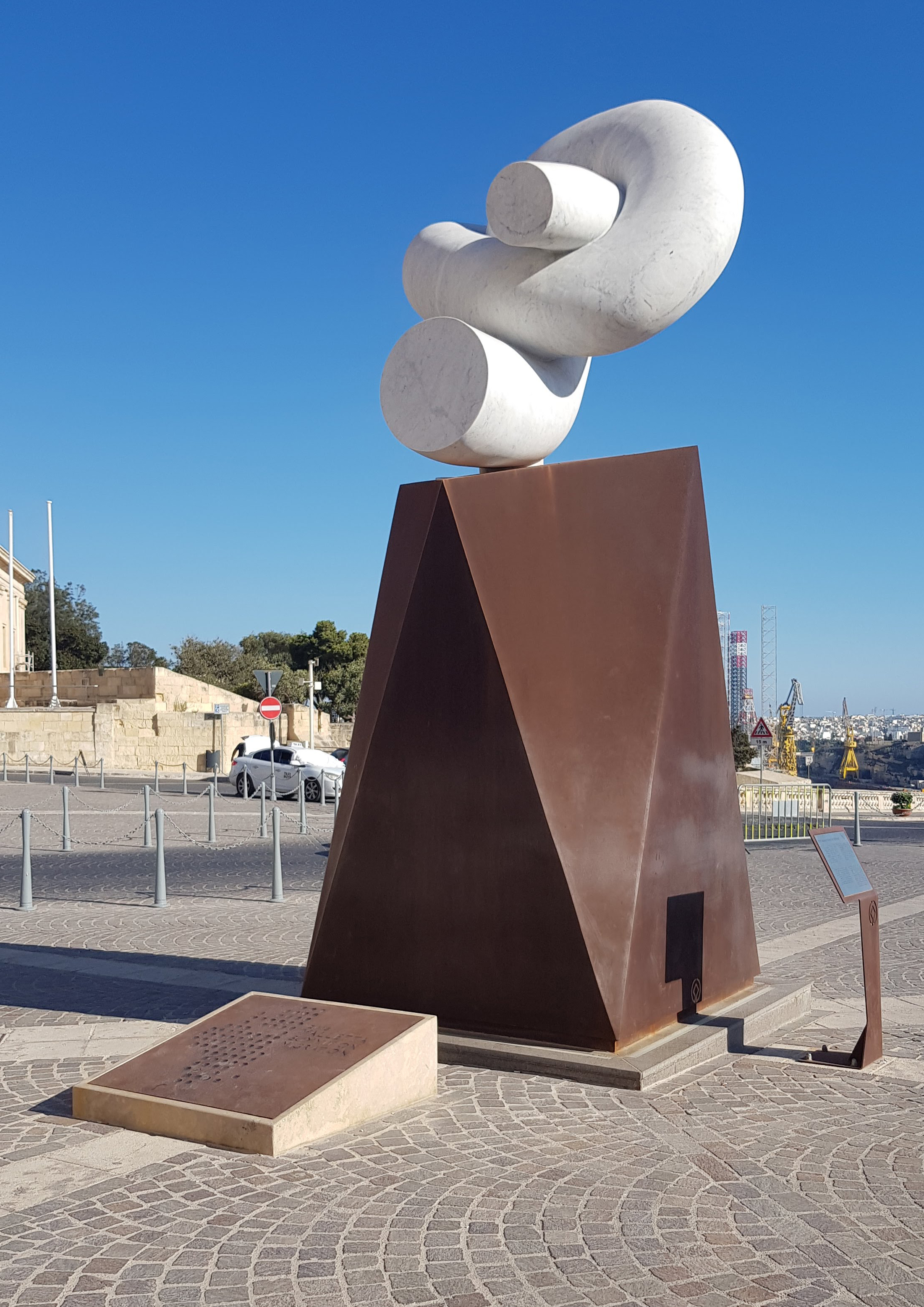
The Knot monument in Castille Square, Valletta

A monument commemorating the summit was erected in Valletta's Castille Square, which had just been refurbished. The monument is called The Knot, and it symbolizes unity between Europe and Africa, as well as Malta's geographic position between the two continents. The monument was designed by the artist Vince Briffa, and was carved from Carrara marble.

== See also ==
- Commonwealth Heads of Government Meeting 2015
