= International Centre for Migration Policy Development =

International organization

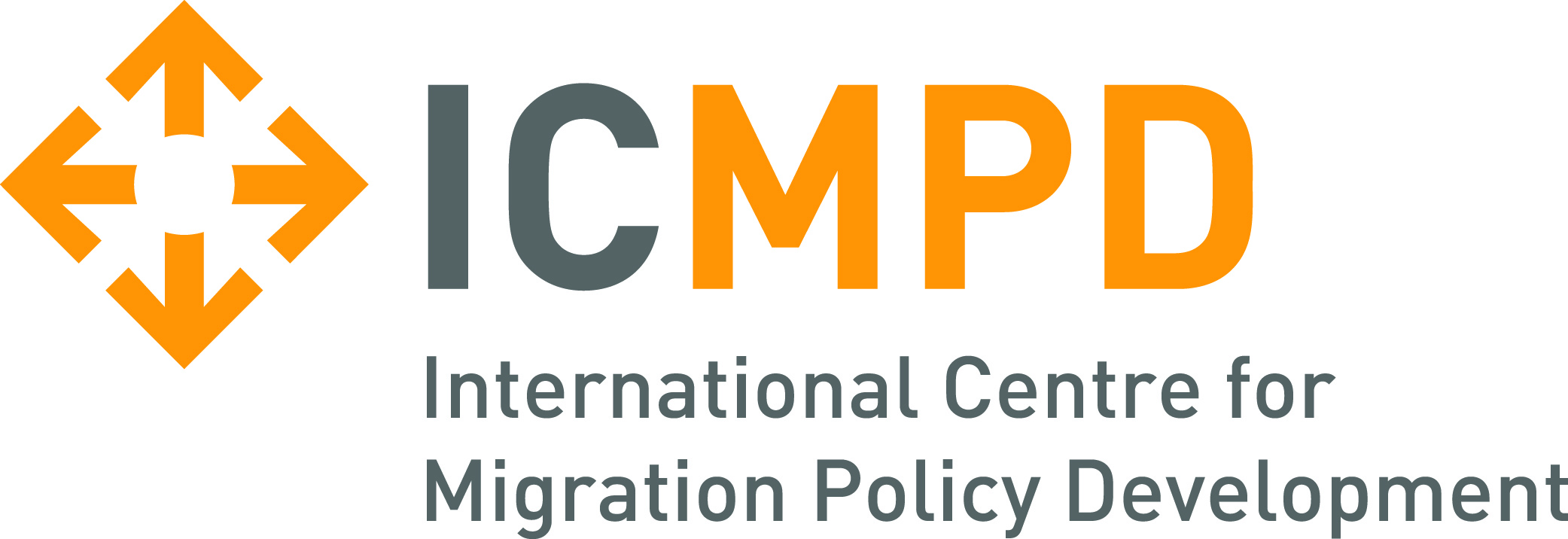
- Abbreviation: ICMPD
- Formation: 1993
- Type: International Organisation
- Headquarters: Vienna
- Director General: Susanne Raab (2026–2030)
- Staff: +600
- Website: icmpd.org

The International Centre for Migration Policy Development (ICMPD) is an international organisation that supports governments and institutions in governing migration effectively. It provides research, policy advice, and capacity development programmes on legal migration, combating human trafficking, border management, migration dialogues, return and reintegration, immigrant integration and migration data. Founded by Austria and Switzerland in 1993, and headquartered in Vienna. ICMPD has a UN observer status and cooperates with more than 715 partners, including EU institutions and UN agencies. Since July 2024, ICMPD has 21 member states, and is active in more than 109 countries.

== Purpose ==
The aim is to develop and implement long-term strategies to manage and govern migration.

The International Centre for Migration Policy Development (ICMPD) is an international organisation that collaborates with national governments, international entities, research institutions, civil society, and the private sector to promote migration dialogue, craft migration-related policies and capacity development and programmes. ICMPD is also operational and engaged in capacity building, policy advice and research, and migration dialogues in various areas of migration. The organisation is a facilitator for the exchange of knowledge and the implementation of practical cooperation between governments and other stakeholders in the migration field.

ICMPD provides policymakers and politicians with information for decision-making, while it's also present on the ground with capacity development activities in various areas of migration. The organisations’ areas of expertise range from international protection and addressing trafficking in human beings to irregular migration, legal and labour migration, return and reintegration, border management, diaspora and the connection between migration and development.

== Activities and programs ==
ICMPD runs around 138 projects in 109 countries, most of which are implemented in one of six defined focus regions: Pan-Africa, Eastern Europe and Central Asia, Mediterranean, Silk Routes, Turkey and Western Balkans.

=== Pan Africa ===
ICMPD provides tailored technical assistance and advisory services that support international priorities and development goals. The work is guided by relevant regional frameworks, like the Agenda 2063 of the African Union (AU).

In 2020, ICMPD signed a Memorandum of Understanding (MoU) with the African Union (AU) Commission to cooperate on topics related to migration governance and mobility, with a focus on the free movement of people, labour migration and mobility, trade, and remittances.

Since 2016, the Support Programme to the Africa-EU Migration and Mobility Dialogue (MMD) has been implemented. The MMD is part of the Joint Africa EU Strategy and supports ICMPD-facilitated migration dialogues as the Rabat Process, Khartoum Process, and the Africa-EU Continent-to-Continent Migration and Mobility Dialogue (C2CMMD). The MMD also monitors the Joint Valletta Action Plan (JVAP) and supports the implementation of projects by local authorities, civil society organisations and diaspora organisations with its grant’s component.

ICMPD is the Secretariat for the Khartoum Process and Rabat Process, promoting cooperation between countries along the migration route between the Horn of Africa and Europe and along the routes linking Central, West and Northern Africa with Europe.

=== Eastern Europe and central Asia ===
ICMPD presence in the region includes Armenia, Azerbaijan, Georgia, Kazakhstan, Kyrgyzstan, Moldova, Tajikistan, Turkmenistan. Ukraine and Uzbekistan. ICMPD’s work in the region focuses the Migration Dialogue Prague Process alongside projects in border management, return and reintegration, trafficking in human beings and mobility in general.

Since April 2021, ICMPD continued the implementation of the Border Management Programme in Central Asia (BOMCA). BOMCA has been one of the largest EU-funded programmes in the region, since its launch in 2003, with ICMPD implementing BOMCA 10 (its tenth phase). The tenth phase focuses on the institutional development of border control agencies, the improvement of detection capacities, the facilitation of trade and the improvement of cross-border cooperation in Central Asia.

From January 2019 to April 2021, Germany, Poland and the Netherlands co-financed the 400,000 euros RESTART project to support the implementation of the Readmission Agreement between the Republic of Azerbaijan and the European Union. The project was centred on return migration and financed for Azerbaijani returnees coming from Europe over a period of 28 months. The project has intended to promote voluntary return, reintegration in the home country by means of benefits in the form of social advice and support, among other things, with the help of finding accommodation, visits to authorities, children's schooling, medical matters and assistance in job search and vocational training, the long-term improvement of living conditions of the returnees and facilitate sustainable return from the European Union and reintegration of Azerbaijani nationals, as well as fighting the causes of flight.

From November 2018 to November 2022, Germany has participated in co-financing the construction of a temporary reception center (TAC Project) for asylum seekers in Armenia with 158,000 euros. The project aimed to assist the Armenian government in improving the reception and accommodation of asylum seekers and in lifting the refugee protection infrastructure.

=== Mediterranean ===
ICMPD has been actively working in the region since 2005, and strengthened its focus North African countries, including Libya, Tunisia, Morocco in 2016. ICMPD has worked on migration dialogues, migration governance, combating trafficking of human beings, integrated border management, and strengthening migration management. ICMPD is present in the Mediterranean with a regional office in Malta, and Field Offices in Jordan, Libya and Tunisia.

From July 2018 to August 2024, ICMPD implemented the Border Management Programme for the Maghreb region (BMP-Maghreb) funded by the European Commission with 65 million euros. This programme was developed in the framework of the European Union Emergency Trust Fund for Stability and Combating the Root Causes of Irregular Migration and the Displaced Persons in Africa (EUTF for Africa), aiming to achieve better migration management by addressing root causes of destabilisation, forced displacement and irregular migration. With a focus on Morocco and Tunisia, BMP-Maghreb aimed to mitigate vulnerabilities arising from irregular migration by strengthening institutions to protect, monitor and control the borders.

=== Silk Routes ===
The regional office was established in 2016, covering Afghanistan, Bangladesh, India, Iran, Iraq, Pakistan, and Sri Lanka. The ICMPD Silk Routes Regional Office, which also hosts the Secretariat of the Budapest Process, is located in Vienna. The Budapest Process is an interregional dialogue on migration that extends across Europe and the Silk Routes region, including Europe's Eastern neighbours, the Western Balkans, and Central Asia.

The regional office works to strengthen a whole-of-government approach to migration management, promoting evidence-based policymaking and the exchange of operational information at both national and regional levels. The 2013 Istanbul Ministerial Declaration of the Budapest Process, along with the 2019 Istanbul Commitments on the Silk Routes Partnership for Migration, endorsed a call for action – a five-year plan, that includes the guiding principles and priorities of the Silk Routes region.

==== Migrant Resource Centres (MRCs) ====
The centres support outgoing, intending, and potential migrants in making informed decisions when considering migrating. The MRCs counsellors provide information on possibilities for safe, legal and orderly migration and rules and regulations, including pre-departure information. The centers operate in person, via phone and on social media platforms.

The MRCS have been implemented in selected Silk Routes and Central Asian Countries. In January 2025, ICMPD opened a new MRC in Sulaymaniyah, Kurdistan Region of Iraq after the inauguration of two MRCs in 2024 in Iraq and Pakistan. The opened centres are in Cumilla and Dhaka (Bangladesh), Baghdad, Basra, Erbil and Sulaymaniyah (Iraq), Bishkek and Osh (Kyrgyzstan), Peshawar, Islamabad and Lahore (Pakistan), Batticaloa (Sri Lanka), Dushanbe (Tajikistan), Tashkent (Uzbekistan) and a virtual one in Afghanistan. Currently 14 centres are operating. The MRCs are established and managed jointly by the responsible government authority and the International Centre for Migration Policy Development (ICMPD). The MRCs also provide support to governmental and non-governmental stakeholders, who are directly or indirectly involved in facilitating or communicating migration-related issues.

Since 2016, the European Union has been the primary donor, with other countries, including Austria, Bulgaria, Denmark, Finland, Germany, Greece, Norway, New Zealand, Sweden, and Switzerland, also key donors in support of the MRCs. Migrant Resource Centres should eventually be fully incorporated into the government structures once the project is over.

=== Turkey ===
Operating in Istanbul and Ankara, the ICMPD Representation in Turkey is a central hub for coordinating project deliveries in Turkey. In Turkey, ICMPD works with national and international authorities within the main portfolios about the Migration management, border management, migration & development, and interdisciplinary matters in Turkey.

Since January 2020, ICMPD has been implementing the Enhancement of Entrepreneurship Capacities for Sustainable Socio-Economic Integration Project (ENHANCER) project in Turkey. ENHANCER is funded by the European Union and implemented in coordination with the Directorate General of Development Agencies under the Ministry of Industry and Technology of the Republic of Turkey. The project works on the inclusion of Syrians under Temporary Protection in Turkey by enabling employment opportunities, entrepreneurship and the creation of new markets for Syrians.

=== Western Balkans ===
ICMPD has been actively engaged in the Western Balkans for over 30 years, supporting national authorities and regional institutions in developing and implementing migration policies. ICMPD works in Albania, Bosnia and Herzegovina, Kosovo (Understood in the context of UNSCR 1244/99), Montenegro, North Macedonia and Serbia.

In January 2025, ICMPD established a dedicated Western Balkans structure and appointed a Special Representative for the region. ICMPD has presence in the region, with active offices in Belgrade, Sarajevo, and Skopje.

ICMPD is the Secretariat of the Network of Anti-Trafficking Coordinators of South-East Europe (NATC SEE). Established in 2010, the network promotes transnational cooperation and facilitate the exchange of expertise in combating human trafficking in the South-East Europe region. The NATC SEE convenes one to two times per year, and in April 2025, in the framework of the Ministerial Meeting of the Brdo Process, the network endorsed its Strategy 2025-2029, focusing on addressing complexities introduced by new technologies, migration patterns and socio-economic factors.

=== Global initiatives ===
Under the Brussels Mission, it hosts project teams with regional and thematic expertise.

Under Global Initiatives, the Migration Partnership Facility (MPF) has been operational since January 2016. MPF is an EU-funded initiative supporting the external dimension of EU migration policy, and supports international cooperation on migration and mobility between EU Member States and priority partner countries. MPF hosts the EU Labour Mobility Practitioners' Network (LMPN) under a topical component of Labour Migration and Mobility. The LMPN has over 220 active members, including practitioners from EU Member States and EU institutions at the operational level, relevant international organisations, foundations, NGOs, think tanks, academic institutions, trade unions, private sector networks/bodies (employers’ associations), diaspora organisations, and migrant associations.

From 2019 to 2022, ICMPD in collaboration with the “Gesellschaft für Organisation, Planung und Ausbildung” (GOPA) and Policy and Management Consulting Group (PMCG) supported the “Programme Migration and Diaspora” (PMD). of the Deutsche Gesellschaft für Internationale Zusammenarbeit (GIZ). ICMPD with the project consortium developed standardized training packages on “Migration Governance” focusing on partner institutions on Albania, Ecuador, Georgia, Ghana, Indonesia, Colombia, Kosovo and Serbia, which it calls "partner countries". The training packages include thematic areas such as Migration and Gender, Regular Labour Migration, and Social and Economic Diaspora Engagement and are available in GIZ’s Atingi platform.

== Events ==
=== Vienna Migration Conference (VMC) ===
This is ICMPD’s main event and takes place every autumn in Vienna since 2016. High-level politicians, leading experts, practitioners from governments, international organisations, academia, media, civil society and the private sector are invited to this event to discuss migration in the EU and beyond.

The event in 2025 covered global and European migration developments, focusing on sustainable solutions including migration partnerships, labour and protection pathways, return, reintegration, EU reforms, and future trends.

=== International Border Management Conference (IBMC) ===
This is an annual event and has taken place yearly since 2018. At the conference, practitioners, policymakers, donors, and experts from various sectors gather to discuss the latest trends, innovations, good practices, and policies in border management and governance globally.

Previous editions took place in Lebanon, Armenia, Ukraine, Jordan, Turkey, and Tunisia. The 7th edition of the IBMC in Tunisia, 2024, focused on multi-dimensional governance, professionalisation, modernisation, and communication, the four drivers identified in the framework of the Migration Capacity Partnership for the Mediterranean (MCP Med).

== Publications ==
ICMPD produces publications within its areas of expertise, supporting research, policy development, and best practices on migration related topics. These include reports, policy briefs, working papers, research studies, and guidelines that address key global and regional issues authored by internal and external authors. The publications cover migration governance, border management, capacity development, migration narratives, migration dialogues, diaspora, return and reintegration, and labour migration, among other topics.

The organisation also releases corporate publications annually, including the ICMPD Migration Outlook and the ICMPD Annual Report.

=== ICMPD Migration Outlook ===
The report analyses every year migration and policy trends for the next year. Besides publishing a Global Migration Outlook, Regional Outlooks covering ICMPD’s priority regions are also published.

For 2026, the ICMPD Migration Outlook pointed to the decline in irregular migration alongside strengthened border security efforts in Europe. It also indicated that Europe would continue efforts to address the labour and demographic gaps more strategically. The report noted that the underlying drivers of displacement remain volatile globally, with peace and security worsening in more than 87 countries.

=== ICMPD Annual Report ===
Published annually, generally between April and May, the report gives an overview of the organisation's activities, projects, programmes, external relations, human resources, regional milestones, figures, and financial performance over the past year. The Annual Report is a transparency resource for stakeholders, partners, and the broader public to understand ICMPD’s work and progress.

== Financing ==
Every year ICMPD discloses in its annual report how it is financed. ICMPD’s financial report is compliant with the International Public Sector Accounting Standards and prepared following the rules governing the financial framework of the organisation.

In 2015, its consolidated budget was 16.8 million euros, in 2025 was 114.6 million euros. The consolidated budget includes the Regular Budget which finances administrative costs (management and infrastructure expenses) and the Programme Budget, which includes earmarked resources for project implementation, programs and support functions. Approximately 79 percent of the program implementation comes from the European Commission, 10 percent from other states, 12 percent from Member States and 0.1 percent from UN and other institutions.

Additional figures were disclosed by the German government upon request by Andrej Hunko, Michel Brandt, Christine Buchholz, other members of the European Parliament and The Left. In 2020 the annual membership fee for Germany was 210,000 euros.

== Member states ==
Austria and Switzerland signed the agreement on the establishment of ICMPD in 1993 in Vienna, Austria. Member states set the strategic direction of the organisation, through Steering Group meetings but also through year-round consultations and close cooperation.

ICMPD’s Steering Group is composed of the Member States, which exercise general supervision of ICMPD, appoint the Director General, and approve strategic decisions. There is a rotation principle for the Steering Group chair and all decisions are taken based on a majority principle.

Since July 2024, ICMPD has 21 member states, which joined in the following order:

- Austria (1993)
- Switzerland (1993)
- Hungary (1995)
- Slovenia (1998)
- Czech Republic (2001)
- Sweden (2002)
- Bulgaria (2003)
- Poland (2003)
- Croatia (2004)
- Portugal (2004)
- Slovakia (2006)
- Romania (2011)
- Bosnia and Herzegovina (2012)
- Serbia (2014)
- North Macedonia (2015)
- Malta (2018)
- Turkey (2018)
- Germany (2020)
- Greece (2021)
- Netherlands (2023)
- Ireland (2024)

In 2020, Germany joined on the basis of a declaration of international contract law issued by the Federal President. Within the Federal Government, the Federal Ministry of the Interior (Germany) is in charge and the Federal Office for Migration and Refugees has been involved as a business unit authority. Recently Ireland joined ICMPD in July 2024.

== Organisational structure ==
ICMPD has over 600 staff members, a mission in Brussels, regional offices in Turkey and Malta, as well as project offices in Africa, Central Asia, the Middle East and South Asia.

=== Director Generals ===
- Jonas Widgren (1993–2004)
- Gottfried Zürcher (2004–2009)
- Peter Widermann (2010–2014)
- Gabriela Abado (Acting Director General, 2015)
- Michael Spindelegger (2016–2025)
- Susanne Raab (2026–2030)

The organisational structure of ICMPD consists of the office of the Director General, Communications, Internal Audit, External & Member States Relations, Brussels Mission, Directorate of Migration Dialogues and Cooperation, Directorate of Policy, Research and Strategy and Directorate for Management. The Brussels Mission, is headed by Ralph Genetzke. The Migration Dialogues and Cooperation (MDC) Directorate is headed by Sedef Dearing. The Policy, Research and Strategy (PRS) is headed by Malin Frankenhaeuser. The Directorate for Management is headed by John Aguirre.

In 2025, ICMPD elected a new Director General (DG) following the end of the second and final five-year term of the current DG, Michael Spindelegger, in December 2025. According to reports in January 2025 former Austrian Minister for Women's Affairs Susanne Raab applied to be the next Director General, following the open call for candidates published by ICMPD in November 2024. ICMPD announced that there were more than 70 applications and published the procedure for the Director General elections. In June 2025, the ICMPD Steering Group, headed by Sweden, elected Susanne Raab as the new Director General.

Susanne Raab has started her term in January 2026. In an interview at the beginning of her term, Susanne Raab said: “It is essential to work on an equal footing with countries of origin, transit, and destination. Without genuine cooperation along the whole route, no technical measure can work”.

== Criticism ==
In October 2020, the Bavarian Interior Minister Joachim Herrmann (CSU) wrote to then Federal Minister of the Interior Horst Seehofer, he planned to implement a special kind of digital refugee card in Bavaria, which could serve as a debit card, in cooperation with Michael Spindelegger and the ICMPD, which would be used as a model for similar projects in Europe. The idea of the debit card carrying other personal data, which could be retrieved by police terminals was developed by Jan Marsalek then CFO of the now defunct wirecard. ICMPD was approached to explore the potential introduction of the card and due to legal complexities, ICMPD proposed a feasibility study to assess compliance with human rights and GDPR. The project was further developed without ICMPD’s involvement and was not pursued forward by the organisation.

In April 2023, NGO "SOS Balkan Route" criticized the involvement of the ICMPD with the refugee camp Lipa. The ICMPD denied the allegations and initiated legal action against the NGO in Mai. The NGO considers this a SLAPP lawsuit.
