= Khartoum process =

Inter-regional forum on migration

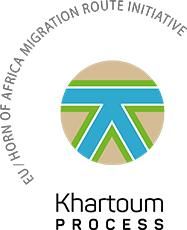
- Formation: 2014
- Website: www.khartoumprocess.net

The Khartoum Process is a platform for political cooperation amongst the countries along the migration route between the Horn of Africa and Europe. It was set up at a ministerial conference on 28 November 2014 in Rome, Italy.

== Description ==
The process aims at establishing a continuous dialogue for enhanced cooperation on migration and mobility. The Process also seeks to support member states in identifying concrete projects to address trafficking in human beings and the smuggling of migrants and other migration-related areas. Additionally, the Khartoum Process gives a new impetus to the regional collaboration between countries of origin, transit and destination regarding the migration route between the Horn of Africa and Europe.

== Stakeholders ==
The following countries are signatories of the Declaration of the Ministerial Conference of the Khartoum Process, also known as the Rome Declaration:

Austria, Belgium, Bulgaria, Croatia, Cyprus, Czech Republic, Denmark, Djibouti, Egypt, Eritrea, Estonia, Ethiopia, Finland, France, Germany, Greece, Hungary, Ireland, Italy, Kenya, Latvia, Lithuania, Luxembourg, Malta, The Netherlands, Poland, Portugal, Romania, Slovakia, Slovenia, Somalia, South Sudan, Spain, Sudan, Sweden, Tunisia and the United Kingdom*.

Since this Declaration, Libya was also invited as a Member of the Khartoum Process upon the establishment of a Government of National Accord, and Norway, Switzerland and Uganda have also become Members of the Process.

*Note: The UK has withdrawn from the European Union (EU) on 31 January 2020 and is no longer a Member State of the EU

== See also ==
- Malta Declaration (European Union)
- Valletta Summit on Migration
- Prague Process (co-operation in migration management)
