= List of international trips made by Tobias Billström as Minister for Foreign Affairs of Sweden =

Since becoming Minister for Foreign Affairs, Tobias Billström has made a number of international trips.

== Table ==
Country	Location(s)	Dates	Source
Finland	Helsinki	21 October 2022	
Estonia	Tallinn	1 November 2022	
Finland	Helsinki	2 November 2022	
Germany	Berlin	10 November 2022	
Belgium	Brussels	14 November 2022	
Jordan	Amman	15–17 November 2022	
France	Paris	21 November 2022	
Lithuania	Vilnius	22 November 2022	
Ukraine	Kyiv	28 November 2022	
Romania	Bucharest	29–30 November 2022	
Poland	Łódź	1–2 December 2022	
United States	Washington D.C.	6–8 December 2022	
Belgium	Brussels	12 December 2022	
Turkey	Ankara	21–22 December 2022	
Belgium	Brussels	23 January 2023	
Latvia	Riga	27 January 2023	
Norway	Tromsø	31 January 2023	
Finland	Helsinki	7 February 2023	
Germany	Munich	17–19 February 2023	
Belgium	Brussels	19 February 2023	
India	New Delhi	2–4 March 2023	
Italy	Rome	3 April 2023	
Serbia	Belgrade	19–20 April 2023	
Montenegro	Podgorica	19–20 April 2023	
Bosnia and Herzegovina	Sarajevo	19–20 April 2023	
Kosovo	Pristina	19–20 April 2023	
Moldova	Chișinău	26–27 April 2023	
Estonia	Tallinn	2–4 May 2023	
Iceland	Reykjavík	16–17 May 2023	
Belgium	Brussels	22 May 2023	
Norway	Oslo	31 May–1 June 2023	
Germany	Wismar	1 June–2 June 2023	
Belgium	Brussels	8 June 2023	
Poland	Warsaw	12 June 2023	
Iceland	Ísafjörður	12–13 June 2023	
France	Paris	16 June 2023	
Luxembourg	Luxembourg	26 June 2023	
United States	Washington D.C.	4–5 July 2023	
Belgium	Brussels	6 July 2023	
Lithuania	Vilnius	10–12 July 2023	
Latvia	Riga	6–7 September 2023	
United States	New York City	18–26 September 2023	
Netherlands	The Hague	28 September 2023	
Oman	Muscat	9–10 October 2023	
Saudi Arabia	Riyadh	9–10 October 2023	
Luxembourg	Luxembourg	23 October 2023	
Norway	Oslo	1 November 2023	
Germany	Berlin	2 November 2023	
Lithuania	Vilnius	6 November 2023	
Finland	Helsinki	8 November 2023	
Belgium	Brussels	13 November 2023	
Finland	Helsinki	27-28 November 2023	
Belgium	Brussels	28-29 November 2023	
North Macedonia	Skopje	29-30 November 2023	
France	Paris	12 December 2023	
Belgium	Brussels	11 December 2023	
Norway	Oslo	14-15 December 2023	
Lithuania	Vilnius	11-12 January 2024	
Belgium	Brussels	22 January 2024	
Belgium	Brussels	1-2 February 2024	
Germany	München	16-18 February 2024	
India	Bangalore	20 February 2024	
India	New Delhi	21–23 February 2024	
United States	Washington D.C.	6–7 March 2024	
Belgium	Brussels	11 March 2024	
Germany	Berlin	21 March 2024	
Finland	Esbo	26 March 2024	
Belgium	Brussels	3–4 April 2024	
United Kingdom	London	15–16 April 2024	
Luxembourg	Luxembourg	22 April 2024	
Denmark	Copenhagen	2–3 May 2024	
United States (Texas)	Texas	13–15 May 2024	
Czech Republic	Prague	30–31 May 2024	
Finland	Borgå	13–14 June 2024	
Luxembourg	Luxembourg	24 June 2024	
Poland	Warsaw	25 June 2024	
USA	Washington D.C.	9–11 July 2024	
Ghana	Accra	12–14 August 2024	
Nigeria	Abuja	12–14 August 2024	
Nigeria	Lagos	15 August 2024	

== See also ==
- List of international prime ministerial trips made by Ulf Kristersson
