= List of international prime ministerial trips made by Magdalena Andersson =

World map highlighting the 12 countries visited by Magdalena Andersson during her premiership Sweden One visit Two visits Seven visits

This is a list of international prime ministerial trips made by Magdalena Andersson, who served as the 34th Prime Minister of Sweden from 30 November 2021 to 18 October 2022.

During her premiership, Andersson made 22 trips to 12 countries. The number of visits per country are:

- One visit to the United Kingdom, Denmark, Poland, the United States, Spain, Ukraine and the Czech Republic.
- Two visits to Finland, France, Norway, and Germany.
- Seven visits to Belgium.

== Trips ==
=== 2021 ===
Country	Location(s)	Dates	Details
Finland	Helsinki	8 December	Andersson travelled to Helsinki as her first trip outside Sweden and met with President Sauli Niinistö and Prime Minister Sanna Marin.
Belgium	Brussels	10 December	Andersson travelled to Brussels to meet with President of the European Council Charles Michel and President of the European Commission Ursula von der Leyen.
Belgium	Brussels	15 December	Andersson travelled to Brussels to attend the 2021 Eastern Partnership Summit with the other heads of state or government leaders of the European Union and the partnership countries.

=== 2022 ===
Country	Location(s)	Dates	Details
France	Paris	16 February	Andersson travelled to Paris and attended the ‘Consultations and commitment prospects for the Sahel’s working dinner. She met the French President, Emmanuel Macron, to review the military presence in Mali.
Belgium	Brussels	17-18 February	Andersson travelled to Brussels to attend the African Union-European Union Summit to strengthen the relations and renew the partnership between the two unions.
Belgium	Brussels	24 February	Andersson travelled to Brussels to attend the Special meeting of the European Council about the 2022 Russian invasion of Ukraine.
Finland	Helsinki	5 March	Andersson travelled to Helsinki along with Swedish Minister for Defence Peter Hultqvist to meet with President Sauli Niinistö, Prime Minister Sanna Marin and Finnish Minister for Defence Antti Kaikkonen following the 2022 Russian invasion of Ukraine.
France	Versailles	10–11 March	Andersson travelled to Versailles to attend an informal Meeting of EU Heads of State and Government to discuss about the 2022 Russian invasion of Ukraine and the reduction of the dependency towards Russia.
United Kingdom	London	14–15 March	Andersson travelled to London to attend a meeting with the countries within the Joint Expeditionary Force (JEF) cooperation. She also met with Prime Minister of the United Kingdom, Boris Johnson, and held bilateral meetings with President of Finland, Sauli Niinistö, and Prime Minister of Iceland, Katrín Jakobsdóttir.
Norway	Evenes	21 March	Andersson travelled with Swedish Leader of the Opposition Ulf Kristersson to Evenes in Norway to visit the 2022 Cold Response military exercise where NATO and Partnership for Peace countries, like Sweden, exercise together.
Belgium	Brussels	24–25 March	Andersson attended the European Council.
Germany	Berlin	28 March	Andersson travelled to Berlin to meet with Chancellor of Germany, Olaf Scholz, where they held bilateral meetings.
Germany	Berlin	3 May	Andersson travelled to Berlin to meet with Chancellor of Germany Olaf Scholz. Finnish Prime Minister Sanna Marin attended the meeting as well.
Denmark	Copenhagen	4 May	Andersson travelled to Copenhagen to attend the 2022 Nordic-India Summit. Andersson hold a bilateral meeting with Prime Minister of India Narendra Modi.
Poland	Warsaw	5 May	Andersson travelled to Warsaw where she co-hosted, along with Prime Minister of Poland Mateusz Morawiecki, an international donors’ conference to support the Ukrainian people following the Russian invasion of Ukraine. Andersson also held a bilateral meeting with Prime Minister of Ukraine Denys Shmyhal.
USA	Washington D.C.	19 May	Andersson travelled to Washington D.C. where she met with President of the United States Joe Biden at the White House to discuss Sweden's and Finland's NATO membership applications, Russias invasion in Ukraine and the transatlantic relations in the changed security policy situation. President of Finland Sauli Niinistö attended the meeting as well.
Belgium	Brussels	30–31 May	Andersson attended a special meeting of the European Council.
Belgium	Brussels	27 June	Andersson met with NATO Secretary-General Jens Stoltenberg do discuss Sweden's membership application to join NATO.
Spain	Madrid	28–30 June	Andersson travelled to Spain to attend the NATO 2022 Madrid summit. On 28 June, she met with President of Turkey Recep Tayyip Erdoğan, along with President of Finland Sauli Niinistö, where they signed an agreement in which Turkey officially endorsed Swedish membership in NATO after weeks of blocking.
Ukraine	Kyiv, Borodianka, Bucha	4 July	Andersson travelled to Ukraine to meet with President of Ukraine Volodymyr Zelenskyy in Kyiv. She also visited Borodianka and Bucha .
Norway	Oslo	15 August	Andersson travelled Oslo to attend an informal meeting with the head of governments of the five Nordic countries.
Czech Republic	Prague	6 October	Andersson attended a meeting with the European heads of states/governments from 42 countries. The meeting centered on the topics of economy and migration. Andersson also met with Turkish President Recep Tayyip Erdogan to discuss Sweden-NATO relations. This was Anderssons final foreign trip as Prime Minister of Sweden.

== Multilateral meetings ==
Magdalena Andersson participated in the following summits during her prime ministership:

Group	Year	
Group	2021	2022
UNGA		September, (United States) New York City
NATO		28–30 June, (Spain) Madrid
EPC	None	6 October, (Czech Republic) Prague
EU summit	December 16–17, (Belgium) Brussels	March 24–25, June 23–24, (Belgium) Brussels
EaP summit	December 15, (Belgium) Brussels	
JEF	None	14–15 March, (United Kingdom) London
██ = Hosted by Sweden ██ = Future event ██ = Did not attend

== See also ==
- Foreign relations of Sweden
- List of state visits made by Carl XVI Gustaf
