= Malta Declaration (European Union) =

Declaration made on 3 February 2017

The Malta Declaration is a declaration made on 3 February 2017 during the European migrant crisis by leaders of the European Union in Malta, which at the time held the six-month rotating presidency of the European Union, that focuses on measures to stem the flow of immigration from Libya to Italy and the EU.

In 2016 over 4,500 people died on the Central Mediterranean route and over 181,000 irregular migrants arrived this way.

A senior EU diplomat noted this to be a long-term strategy.

The declaration states that "efforts to stabilize Libya are now more important than ever, and the EU will do its utmost to contribute to that objective" and that "with hundreds having already lost their lives in 2017 and spring approaching, [the EU is] determined to take additional action to significantly reduce migratory flows along the Central Mediterranean route and break the business model of smugglers".

== The plan ==
The plan includes increasing training and equipment for the Libyan coastguard, further efforts to block smuggling routes, increasing assisted voluntary return activities, increasing EU involvement with countries near Libya, supporting local communities on migration routes and in coastal areas to improve their socio-economic situation.

The declaration also declares the need to ensure "adequate reception capacities and conditions" in Libya for migrants in cooperation with the UNHCR and IOM.

The European Commission will mobilise an initial €200 million in additional funding for the implementation of the declaration.

== See also ==
- Immigration policy
- Khartoum process
- Libyan Civil War (2014–present)
- Opposition to immigration § No solution to underlying problems
