= Susanne Raab =

Austrian politician (born 1984)

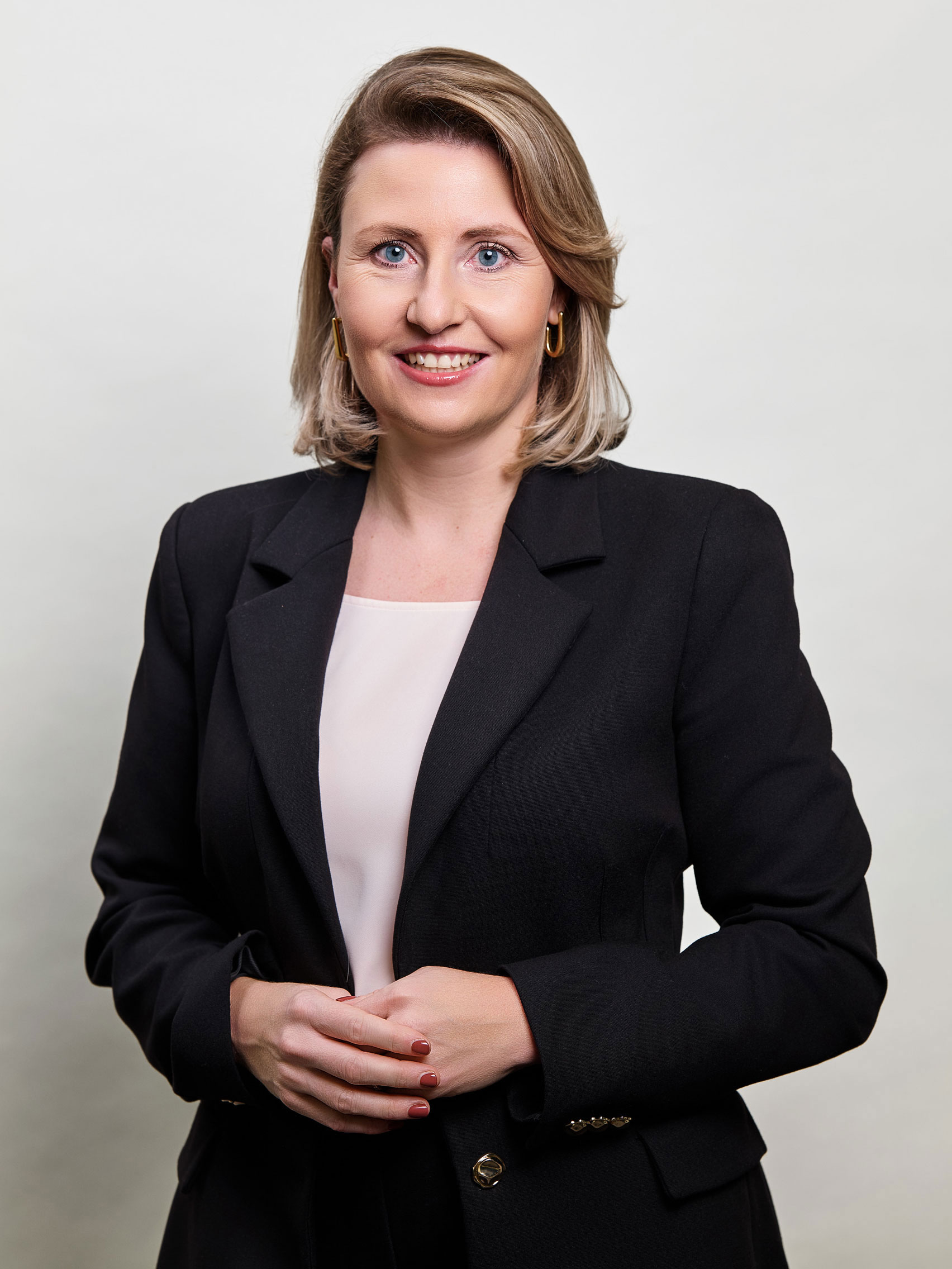
- Susanne Raab, 2025

Director General, International Centre for Migration Policy Development (ICMPD)
- Incumbent
- Assumed office 1 January 2026
- Preceded by: Michael Spindelegger (2016–2025)

Federal Minister for Women, Family, Integration and Media
- In office 7 January 2020 – 3 March 2025
- Chancellor: Sebastian Kurz; Alexander Schallenberg; Karl Nehammer
- Preceded by: Christine Aschbacher (2020) and herself
- Succeeded by: Claudia Plakolm, Eva-Maria Holzleitner and Andreas Babler (2025)

Personal details
- Born: 20 October 1984 (age 41) Vöcklabruck, Austria
- Party: Austrian People's Party
- Children: 1
- Education: University of Innsbruck

Susanne Raab (German: [sʊˈzanɛ ʁaːp]; née Knasmüller; born 20 October 1984) in Vöcklabruck is the Director General of the International Centre for Migration Policy Development (ICMPD). She is an Austrian civil servant, jurist and politician of the Austrian People's Party (ÖVP), who served as Federal Minister from 2020 to 2025. Prior to her political career, Susanne Raab held several key leadership positions in the Austrian civil service. First as Legal Advisor for Asylum and Migration Affairs in the Ministry of the Interior, then as Head of the Department for Integration Coordination and eventually as Director General for Integration in the Austrian Ministry for Europe, Integration and Foreign Affairs from 2017 to 2020.

On 7 January 2025, Raab announced her withdrawal from federal politics and her position as minister in order to apply for the post of Director General of ICMPD. Since the swearing-in of the new federal government on 3 March 2025, she has no longer been a member of the government, but remained a member of the National Council until 22 September 2025. On 5 June 2025, she was elected and designated in Stockholm as the new Director General of ICMPD by its member states. Raab assumed office as Director General in January 2026.

== Education and early career ==
Susanne Raab studied psychology (2003–2009) and law (2003–2010) at the University of Innsbruck, earning a master’s degree in both fields. In November 2010, she received her doctorate in law from the University of Innsbruck with a doctoral thesis on compensation claims under Austrian antitrust law.

During her school and university years, Susanne Raab spent time abroad, including a period working at a women’s shelter in Brazil. She also held various leadership roles in volunteer organizations, such as the Schülerunion (Student Union) and the European Law Students’ Association.

During her doctoral studies, Susanne Raab worked as a Research Assistant (Pre-Doc) at the Institute for Civil Law at the University of Innsbruck, focusing on European private law, and as a Research Associate at the European Centre of Tort and Insurance Law in Vienna.

In 2010, she joined the Austrian Federal Ministry of the Interior as a Senior Consultant and Legal Advisor for Asylum and Migration Affairs. At the same time, she continued to contribute to research for several years as a Research Associate in Asylum and Migration Law at the Institute for Public Law at the University of Salzburg.

Beginning in November 2011, she served as Head of the Integration Coordination Unit at the Federal Ministry of the Interior. In March 2014, the integration portfolio was incorporated into the Federal Ministry for Europe, Integration and Foreign Affairs, where Susanne Raab became Head of the newly established Department for Integration Coordination. In September 2017, she was appointed Director General for Integration in the Foreign Ministry, becoming Austria’s youngest head of section.

== Political career ==
Susanne Raab was sworn in on 7 January 2020 by Federal President Alexander Van der Bellen as Federal Minister without portfolio in the Kurz II government. On 8 January 2020, she became Federal Minister in the Federal Chancellery , responsible for women and gender equality, ethnic minority groups, and religious affairs. On 29 January 2020, the responsibilities for integration, transferred from the Ministry of Foreign Affairs to the Federal Chancellery, were additionally assigned to her. This made Raab the Federal Minister for Women and Integration in the Federal Chancellery. From 1 February 2021 to 4 January 2022, Susanne Raab served as Federal Minister for Women, Family, Youth and Integration in the Federal Chancellery. From 5 January 2022 to 3 March 2025 she served as Federal Minister for Women, Family, Integration and Media.

As Minister for Women, Raab placed a particular focus on protecting women from violence. During the COVID-related lockdown in spring 2020, she and Justice Minister Alma Zadić proactively put together a package of measures to counter the anticipated rise in cases of domestic violence. In the course of the 2020 budget negotiations, Raab succeeded in securing the largest increase in the women’s budget since 2010. Significant increases were also achieved in the years that followed, with the budget reaching 33.6 million Euros in 2024, resulting in a tripling of the overall budget since Raab took office. In 2022, to advance equality between women and men in Austria, she founded the Austrian Fund for the Strengthening and Promotion of Women and Girls “LEA – Let’s empower Austria”.

Besides several bilateral visits to European and North American countries, Susanne Raab represented Austria three times at the annual United Nations Commission on the Status of Women in New York during her tenure as Federal Minister.

As Minister for Integration, Raab significantly expanded the mandatory values and orientation courses to three days and launched a pilot project to extend them to five days. Since 2015, a total of 7,900 values and orientation courses have been held, with around 108,000 participants.

As Federal Minister for Media, Susanne Raab reformed and reorganized Austria’s system of media funding. Key measures included the introduction of new support schemes for quality journalism and digital transformation, both with additional funding, as well as the implementation of a process aimed at increasing transparency and accountability in the allocation of subsidies and advertising.

On 7 January 2025, Raab announced that she would be leaving politics to apply for the position of Director General of the international migration organization ICMPD. In June 2025, Raab was elected and designated by its member states to become the new Director General of ICMPD, effective January 1, 2026.

From 24 October 2024 to 22 September 2025 Susanne Raab served as Member of the National Council. Her seat in the National Council was taken over on 23 September 2025 by Franz Hörl.

Raab assumed office as Director General of the International Centre for Migration Policy Development in January 2026.
