= Mediterranean Conference Centre =

- Dar il-Mediterran għall-Konferenzi
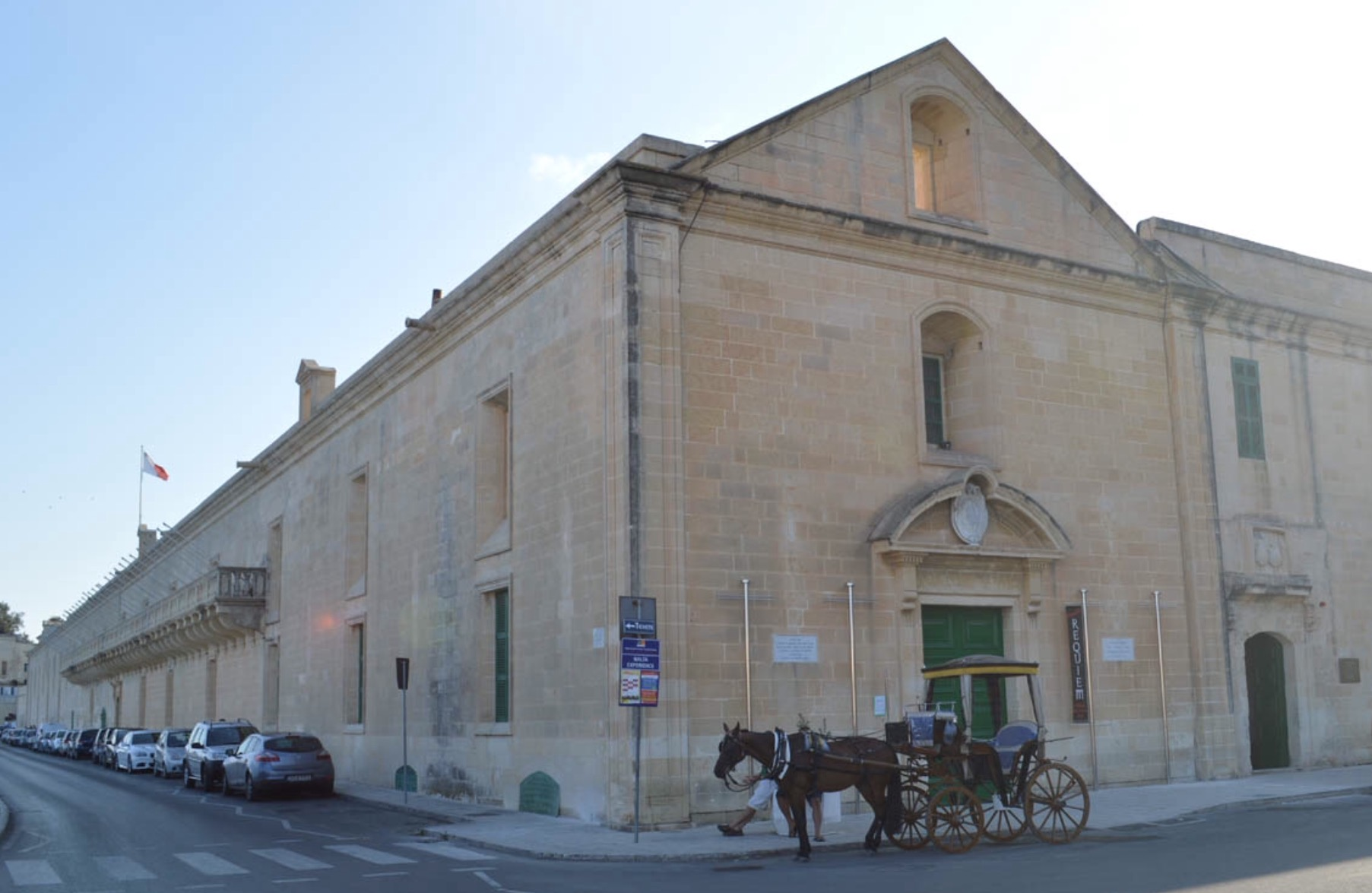
- The MCC in September 2016
- Interactive map of the Mediterranean Conference Centre area
- Former names: Sacra Infermeria; Holy Infirmary
- Alternative names: MCC

General information
- Status: Intact
- Type: Hospital (now conference centre)
- Location: Valletta, Malta
- Coordinates: 35°53′58.2″N 14°31′4.8″E
- Construction started: 1574
- Renovated: 1596–1712
- Owner: Government of Malta

Technical details
- Material: Limestone
- Floor area: 7,000 m^{2} (75,000 sq ft)

Design and construction
- Architect: probably Girolamo Cassar

Website
- www.mcc.com.mt

The Mediterranean Conference Centre (MCC, Maltese: Dar il-Mediterran għall-Konferenzi) is a conference centre in Valletta, Malta. The building was built as a hospital in the 16th century by the Order of St. John, and it was known as the Sacra Infermeria or the Holy Infirmary (Maltese: Il-Furmarija). It was known as the Grand Hôspital during the French occupation of Malta and during the British period was named as the Station Hospital.

It was one of the leading hospitals in Europe until the 18th century, and remained in use until 1920. It had a capacity to keep from 500 to 2,500 patients. The building is now used for multiple banquets, exhibitions, international conventions and theatrical shows. The Republic Hall seats up to 1,400 audience members in its theatre space, making it one of the largest theatres in Malta. The central courtyard of the old infirmary was transformed into what is now the theatre.

== History ==
=== Hospital ===
The Holy Infirmary was ordered to be built by Grand Master Jean de la Cassière on 7 November 1574, after a Chapter General, to replace the one in Birgu. Construction began the same year. It was completed towards the end of the 16th century. Its architect is not known, but it is usually attributed to Girolamo Cassar.

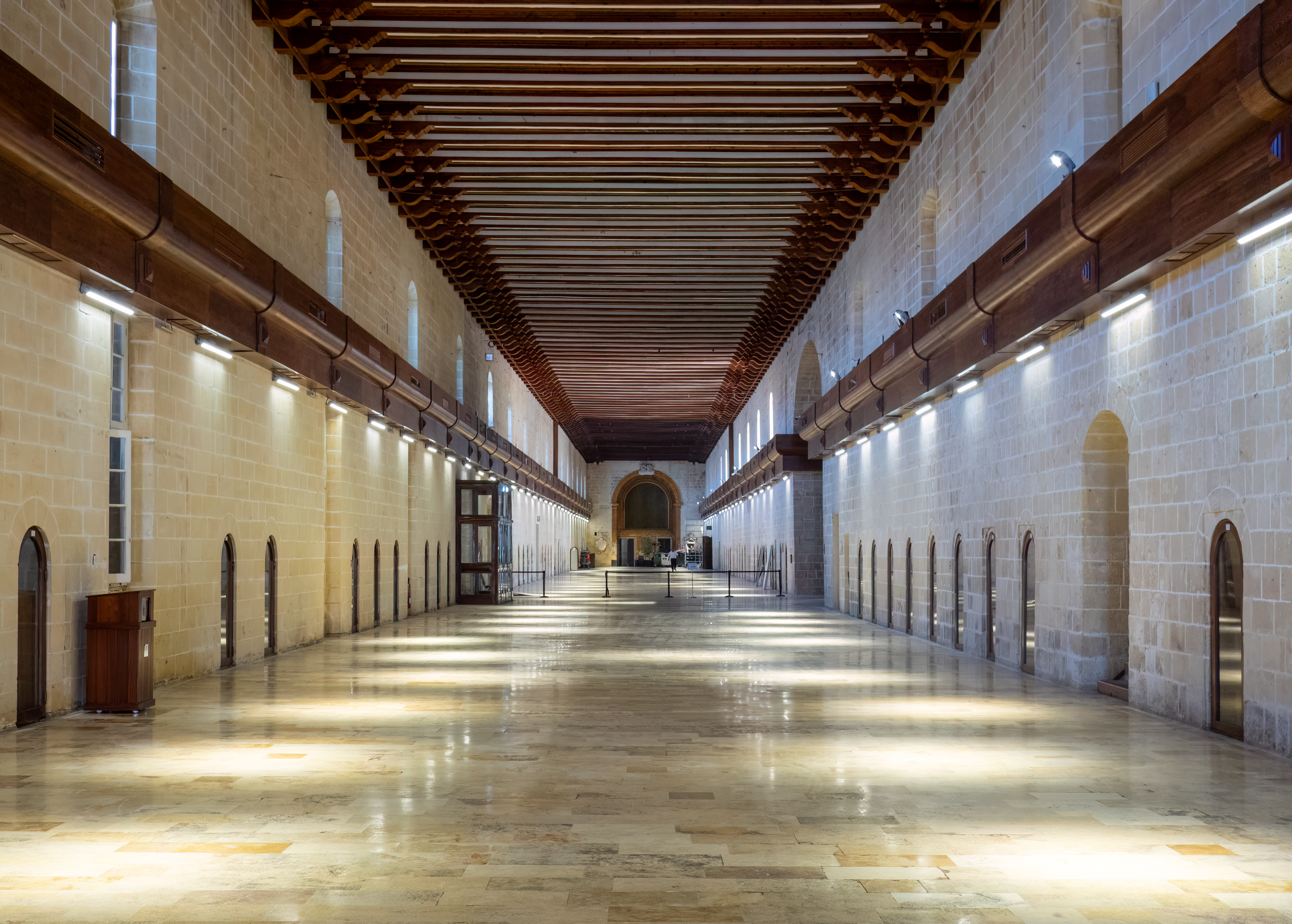
The Great Ward in 2023

It was meant to receive Maltese and foreign patients, as well as to provide lodging to pilgrims travelling to the Holy Land. It also had two pharmacies. In 1596 a phalange was built, which was meant to accommodate the patients with venereal and contagious diseases. In 1636, one of the pharmacies was closed down.

During the reign of Grand Master Raphael Cotoner, the infirmary was enlarged, with more wards added. This work continued until 1666, during the reign of Raphael's successor and brother, Nicolas Cotoner. The ‘Old Ward’ was also extended. During his reign, in 1676, a School of Anatomy and Surgery was established in the infirmary itself. A dissection room was built in the infirmary due to the school, which was later shifted to the site of the graveyard outside the infirmary. More work was carried out in 1712, during the reign of Grand Master Ramon Perellos y Roccaful. These included a Quadrangle, the Chapel of the Blessed Sacrament, a laboratory and a pharmacy.

When the French, under Napoleon Bonaparte, occupied Malta in 1798, they made alterations to the hospital. They improved its ventilation, sanitation and lighting. They also changed it to a military hospital to accommodate the sick French sailors and soldiers, which resulted in the name change from Sacra Infermeria to Hopital Militaire. As soon as the Maltese insurrection began, the hospital's efficiency began to deteriorate. Supplies like medication, fresh food, water and clothing were scarce. Diseases like nightblindness, scurvy, intestinal diseases and phthisis were common. The French capitulated on 5 September 1800 and it was immediately occupied by 350 British Troops.

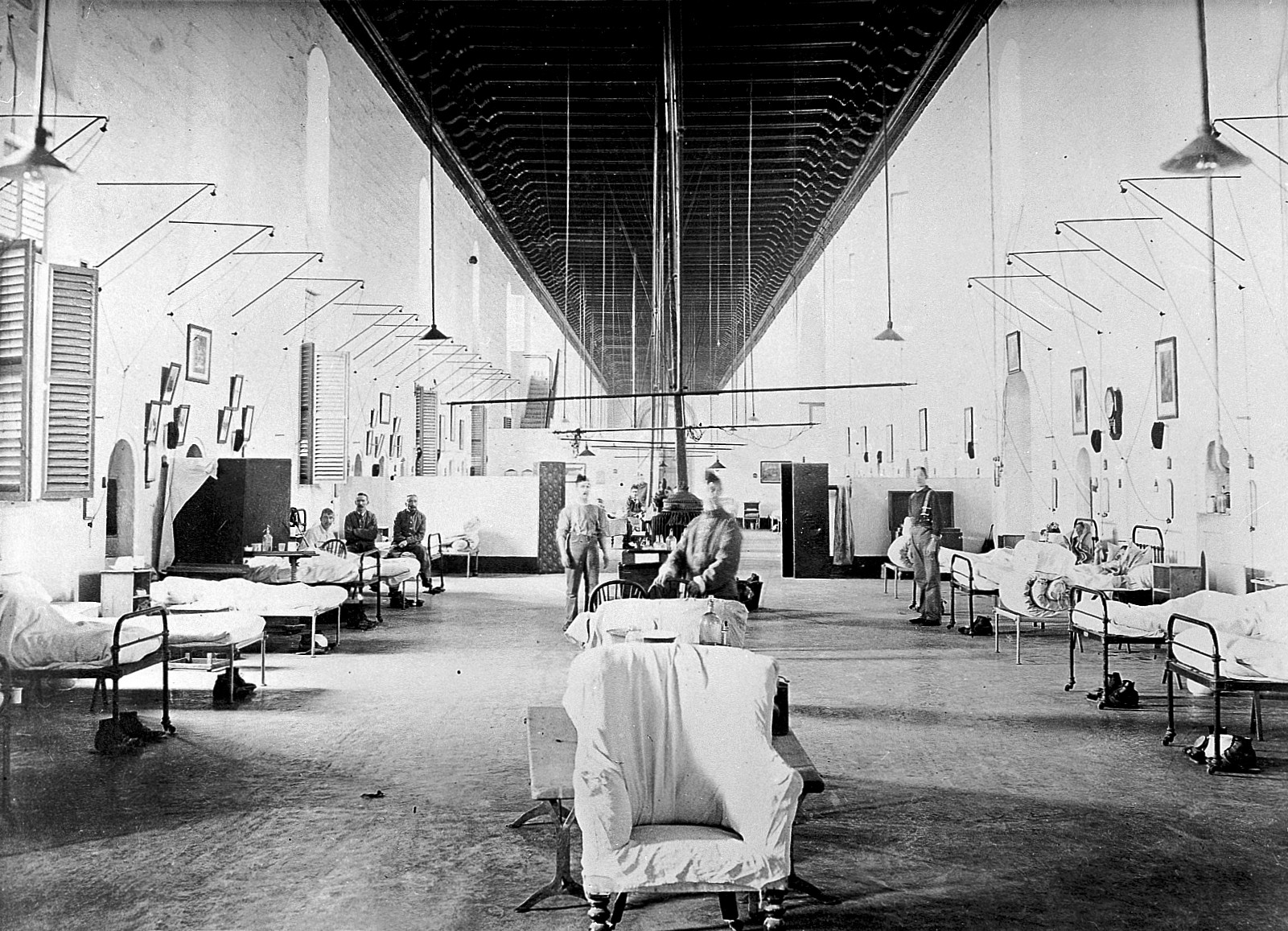
Great Ward of the hospital in 1906 with entire original ceiling

The new General Hospital now became a Station Hospital to accommodate the wounded British soldiers being brought in by Hospital ships. This was done due to Station Hospital's strategic position overlooking the harbour. This meant that the seriously injured troops could be easily and quickly transported there. The hospital saw much use mainly during the Napoleonic Wars, the Crimean War and the First World War. In fact, by World War I, Malta was known as the 'Nurse of the Mediterranean'. Between 1863 and 1865 more alterations were made to improve the building.

The Station Hospital was brought to an end in 1918, by the conclusion of the Great War.

=== Subsequent uses ===
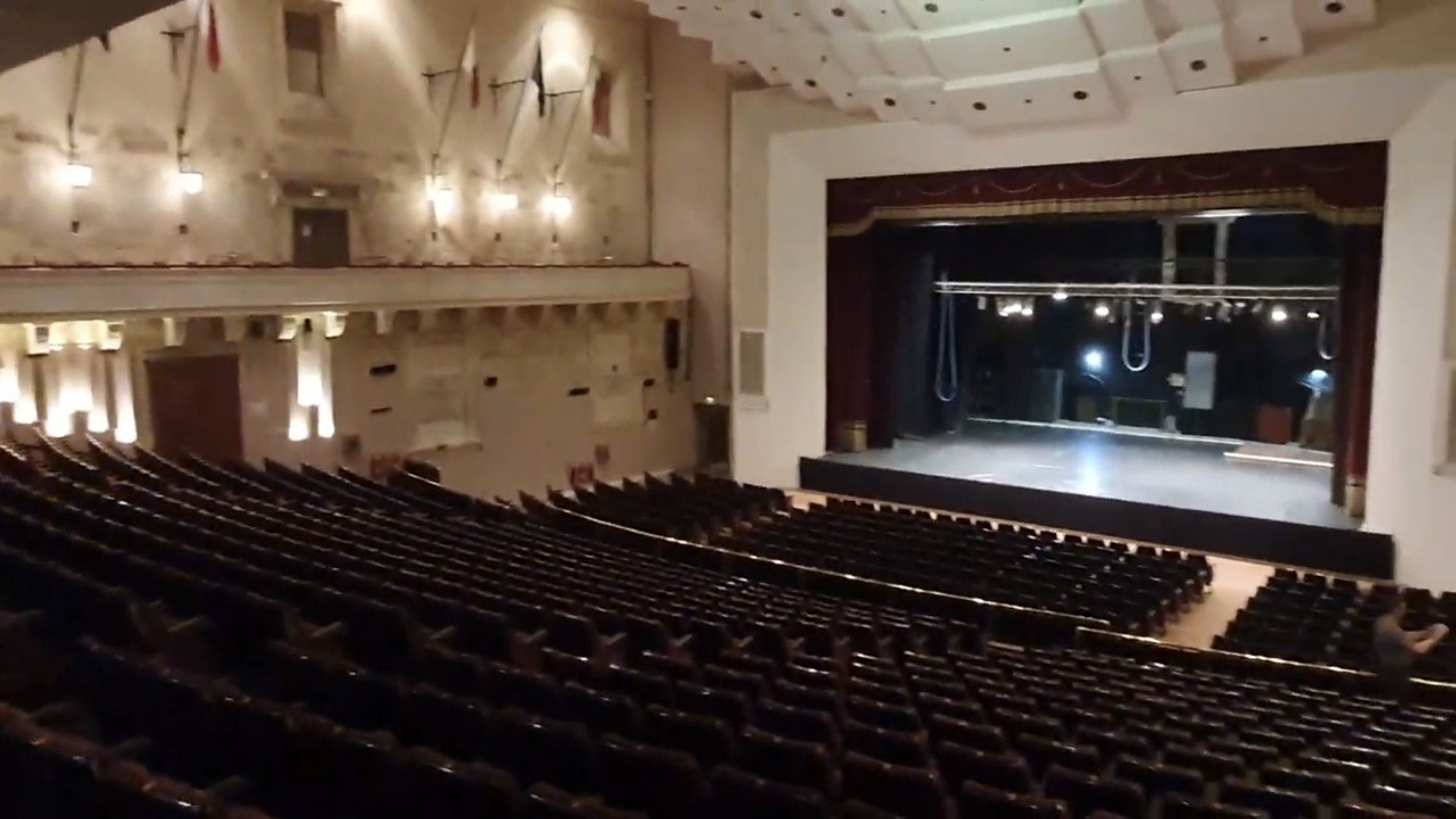
Interior of the Republic Hall (MCC)

From 1920 until May 1940 it served as the headquarters of the Malta Police Force. The building is mentioned in the Antiquities List of 1925. It was evacuated during the Second World War during which it took four direct hits, which destroyed certain parts of it. After the War, the part of the 'Great Ward' which remained became a Command Hall for the Allied Troops. It remained so until 1950. Afterwards it became a Children's Theatre for a year. In 1959, the centre became a school and an examination centre. Restoration was attempted multiple times, however in 1978 a full restoration started and on 11 November 1979, the current centre was inaugurated. It was later awarded the Europa Nostra Diploma of Merit.

The centre has since housed many conferences, meetings, summits and other events, such as the Valletta Summit on Migration and the Commonwealth Heads of Government Meeting 2015.

The Sacra Infermeria is listed on the National Inventory of the Cultural Property of the Maltese Islands.

On 20 November 2016, the centre was the official venue for the Junior Eurovision Song Contest of the same year. It also held the 2016 Malta Eurovision Song Contest earlier that year in January. The venue was also used for 'Vocal Aid' singings by Stage Coach Malta.

== 1987 blaze ==
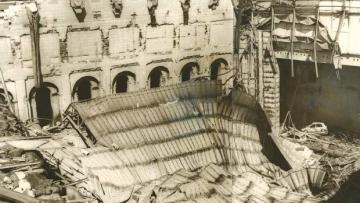
Fire damage as a result of the 1987 MCC blaze

On 25 March 1987, a fire broke out in the Republic Hall causing significant damage. The blaze broke out when Laser Point Limited was preparing for a laser show to commemorate Daihatsu’s launch of its Charade car model in Malta. The cause of the fire was a laser beam that was focused on the Maltese Coat of Arms that was above the stage curtain. Within minutes, the fire spread through the hall, destroying it in the process. There were no injuries but the hall was decimated. The Blaze started at about 6pm and raged for three hours, causing the roof of the hall to collapse.

Charles Bonello, the theatre manager, testified in the subsequent court case that smoke started to emanate from the centre of the coat of arms "like a chimney". According to his statement, at first, only a small portion of the emblem was on fire but soon the whole thing was ablaze. The laser was 18 watts, much stronger than what was typically used in entrainment venues. The fire alarm failed to ring, the fire extinguishers also failed, and no water came out from the pipes. The court-appointed experts concluded that "there were no sufficient means for the fire to be controlled."

The theatre workmen were not properly trained and the venue had insufficient firefighting equipment, such as a fire curtain as is often used in theatres. The court-appointed experts stated, "The firefighting equipment was poor... and inadequate to control the fire and stop it from spreading until the fire engines arrived."

The subsequent court case lasted years, only resolving on 30 January 2013. Mr Justice Joseph Azzopardi ruled that the Maltese Government, Daihatsu UK Limited (since renamed to MFPS Limited) and Laser Point Ltd. were jointly liable for the incident and had to pay the venue €6,730,006.99 in damages. Half the amount were to be borne by the government.

Peter Fenech, the theatre's chairman at the time of the ruling, stated, "Although the MCC had been partly blamed, its responsibility was not related to the fire but, rather, to certain safety features that the court felt should have been in place and allegedly were not functioning."

== Architecture ==
The Sacra Infermeria originally had two wards with a central courtyard, but was subsequently enlarged to have six large wards. The main hall was once the largest hall in Europe with a length of 480 feet. It also has a monumental staircase designed in the form of a flight of stairs going down against a wall and then turn midway opposite the other side of the wall. The corridors and underground halls have vaulted ceilings in the form of a cross.
