= Prague Process (co-operation in migration management) =

- Formation: 2009
- Members: 50 members
- Official languages: English, Russian
- Website: www.pragueprocess.eu

The Prague Process is a regional policy process and a targeted migration dialogue promoting migration partnerships among its 50 participating states of the European Union, Schengen Area, Eastern Partnership, the Western Balkans, Central Asia, and Turkey.

The Process was developed as a part of the EU external migration and asylum policy in line with the overarching framework called the Global Approach to Migration and Mobility (GAMM). In the context of the GAMM the Prague Process has been given a priority as a regional dialogue process towards the East.

== History, key principles and co-operation areas ==
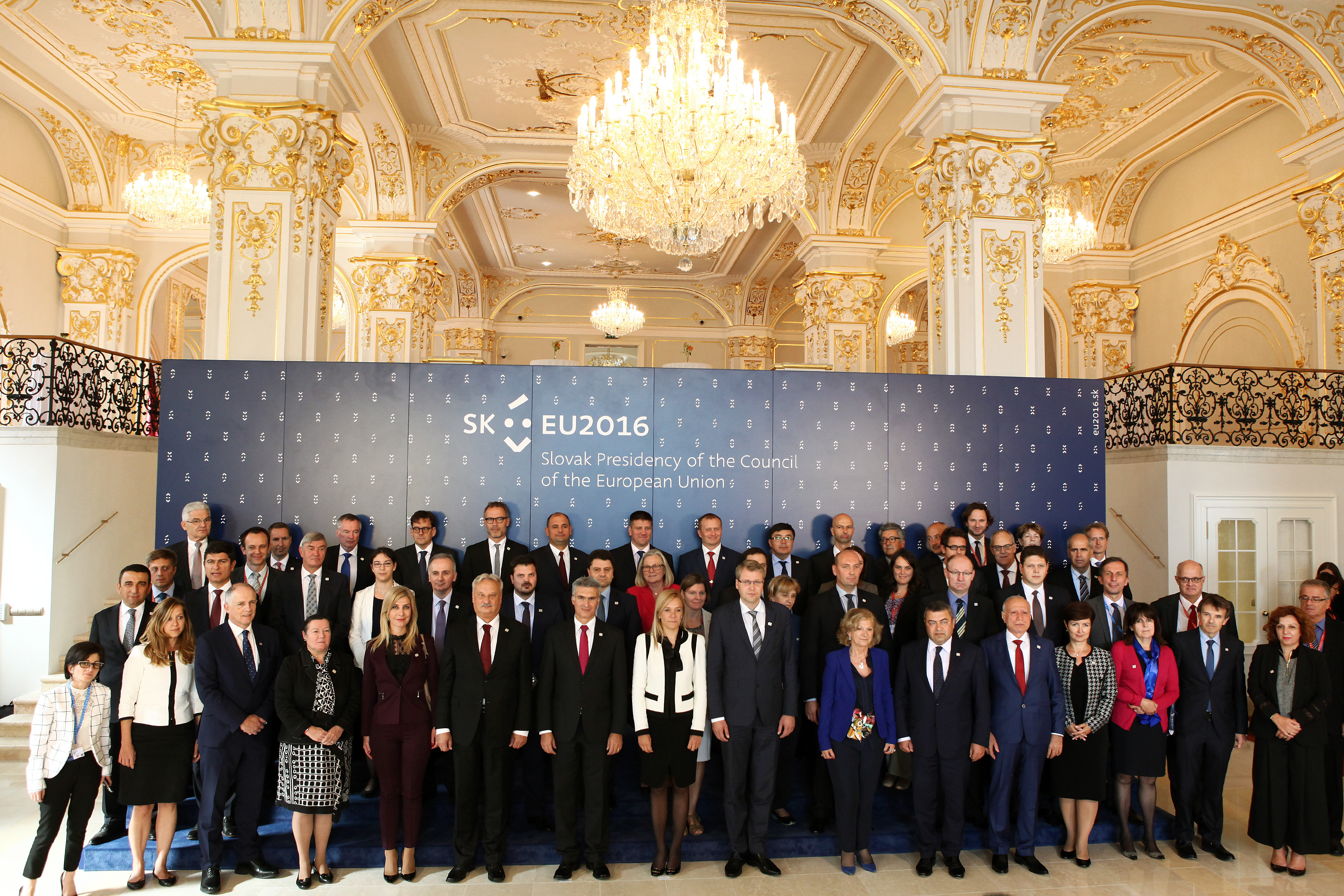
3rd Prague Process Ministerial Conference

The Prague Process originated from the EU financed project "Building Migration Partnerships", and was initiated during the Czech EU Presidency with the signature of the Prague Process Joint Declaration at the Ministerial Conference in April 2009.

In the Joint Declaration the participating states agreed to "strengthen co-operation in migration management, to explore and develop agreed principles and elements for close migration partnerships between their countries, following a comprehensive, balanced, pragmatic and operational approach, and respecting the rights and human dignity of migrants and their family members, as well as of refugees." The Joint Declaration together with the Prague Process Action Plan 2012–2016, adopted at the second Ministerial Conference of the Prague Process in Poznan in November 2011, set the key principles, and main co-operation areas (mirror the GAMM), which are as follows:

- Preventing and fighting illegal migration;
- Readmission, voluntary return and sustainable reintegration;
- Legal migration with a special emphasis on labour migration;
- Integration of legally residing migrants;
- Migration, mobility and development;
- Strengthening capacities in the area of asylum and international protection (this topic was first brought up in the Action Plan).

The Ministerial Declaration signed by the parties at the 3rd Prague Process Ministerial Conference in Bratislava gave a mandate to the Process for the years 2017–2021. The 4th Ministerial Conference held in Prague under the Czech EU Presidency in October 2022 saw the adoption of the Joint Declaration and the Prague Process Action Plan 2023-2027.

== Leading and participating states ==
The Czech Republic acted as a leader of the Prague Process until December 2010, followed by Poland (until 2017), Lithuania (until 2020), and the Czech Republic once more, which chairs the process at present.

The list of members consists of:

- Albania
- Armenia
- Austria
- Azerbaijan
- Belgium
- Bosnia and Herzegovina
- Bulgaria
- Croatia
- Cyprus
- Czech Republic
- Denmark
- Estonia
- Finland
- France
- Georgia
- Germany
- Greece
- Hungary
- Ireland
- Italy
- Kazakhstan
- Kosovo
- Kyrgyzstan
- Latvia
- Liechtenstein
- Lithuania
- Luxembourg
- Macedonia
- Malta
- Montenegro
- Netherlands
- Norway
- Poland
- Portugal
- Moldova
- Romania
- Serbia
- Slovakia
- Slovenia
- Spain
- Sweden
- Switzerland
- Tajikistan
- Turkey
- Turkmenistan
- Ukraine
- Uzbekistan

The role of the Secretariat/ support Team is carried out by International Centre for Migration Policy Development.

== Projects under the Prague Process umbrella ==
Prague Process Targeted Initiative (PP TI)

Full name:Support for the implementation of the Prague Process and its Action Plan.

To support the implementation of the Prague Process and its Action Plan, in August 2012 the Ministry of Interior of the Republic of Poland and the European Commission initiated a project called the Prague Process Targeted Initiative. The project is being jointly implemented by Poland, Czech Republic, Germany, Hungary, Romania, Slovakia, Sweden, and ICMPD in its role of the Prague Process Secretariat. All Prague Process member states participate in the project to certain extent.

The project strives to strengthen and maintain an expert level dialogue and information exchange through co-operation within the network of Prague Process National Contact Points. It also works on building up a Knowledge Base in a form of state-owned Migration Profiles (Extended and Light versions), which describe migratory situation of the Prague Process states, and interactive online map – I-Map. Additionally, 7 Pilot Projects, that complement implementation of certain actions of the Prague Process Action Plan, are being implemented within the PP TI framework. The Pilot Projects focus on Illegal migration, Legal migration, Migration and Development, and Asylum & International protection.

ERIS

Full name: Development of joint principles, procedures and standards on integration policies between the Russian Federation and European partners.

The ERIS project, implemented in the period February 2013 – January 2015 and led by the Czech Republic, Austria, and the Russian Federation, was focused on further development of migration management systems in the sphere of integration of legally residing immigrants. The project aimed at exchange of knowledge on integration policies between project partners, at establishment and maintenance of institutionalised co-operation between migration and integration authorities of participating partners, and at development of joint principles, procedures and standards for integration policies.

As an outcome of the project, a Manual on the principles, procedures and standards for integration policies was developed.

EaP-SIPPAP

Full name: Eastern Partnership co-operation in the fight against irregular migration – Supporting the implementation of the Prague Process Action Plan.

The 2-year project EaP-SIPPAP was implemented by Hungary, Latvia, Poland, Slovakia, and Romania in the period April 2013 – July 2015 under the lead of the Hungarian Ministry of Interior. The project targeted institutions in the border management sphere in 6 Eastern Partnership countries: Armenia, Azerbaijan, Belarus, Georgia, Moldova, Ukraine.
