= Blue Sky M incident =

Migrant incident in the Ionian Sea

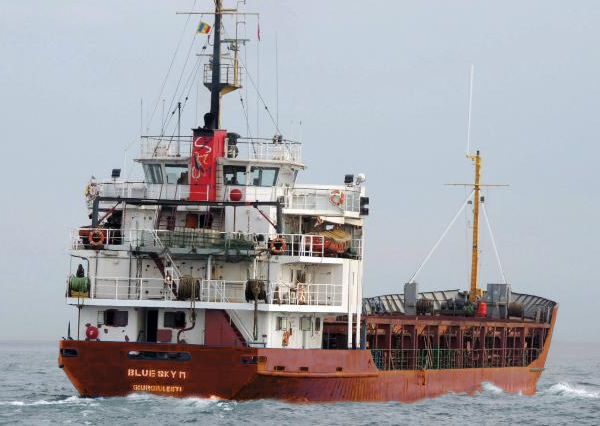
MV Blue Sky M.

The Blue Sky M incident is a maritime incident which took place on 30–31 December 2014 in the Ionian Sea, when a cargo vessel carrying many migrants from Syria and neighbouring states was abandoned by its crew. The Moldovan-flagged MV Blue Sky M had left Korfez, Turkey heading for Rijeka in Croatia.

== See also ==
- Ezadeen incident - a very similar incident which occurred just days later
- Timeline of the European migrant crisis
