= November 2016 Libya migrant shipwrecks =

Maritime incidents in Libya

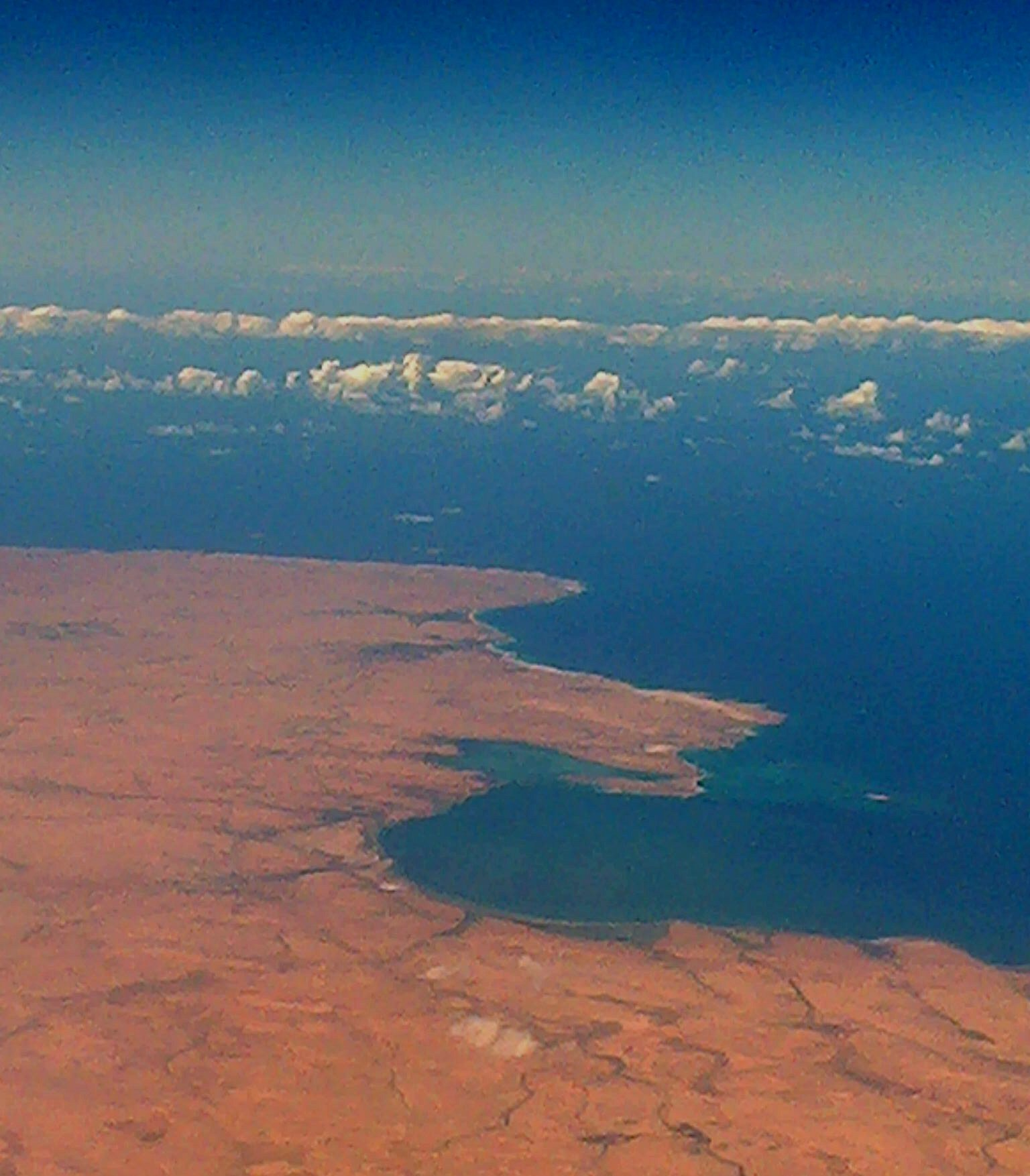
Libyan coastland

On November 3, 2016, around 240 people were killed in two migrant boat capsizing incidents off the coast of Libya. Twenty-nine people survived the first wreck, with about 120 deaths reported. Only two people survived the second wreck, and again around 120 deaths were reported. Another one hundred people are believed to have drowned off the coast when their boat sank after they were abandoned off Libya without a motor on 17 November. Twenty-seven survivors have been transported to Italy. An estimated 4,700 people have died trying to cross the Mediterranean Sea in 2016.

== See also ==
- Timeline of the European migrant crisis
- 2016 Egypt migrant shipwreck
