= Ezadeen incident =

2015 maritime incident

Coordinates: 39°40′N 16°32′E

The Ezadeen incident is a maritime incident which took place in very early January 2015 in the Ionian Sea.

== Events ==
In October 2014 Sierra Leone-flagged MV Ezadeen departed from Tartus, Syria towards Turkey. Then it sharply looped back south towards Cyprus. It arrived at Famagusta, in northern Cyprus in November, and departed from there on 19 December 2014, then sailed north once again towards the Turkey coast before zig-zagging in an area of open water between Turkey and Cyprus. Then it went westwards to the north of Crete, then changed direction and headed northwards along the coast of Greece before ending up drifting across towards Italy. There were 360 people on board, all of them Syrian refugees.

One of the refugees used a radio on board to tell Italian coastguards: “We're without crew, we're heading toward the Italian coast and we have no-one to steer.” The coastguards then boarded the ship and it was towed by an Icelandic ship that is part of the EU Frontex border control mission to Italian port of Corigliano Calabro. It arrived there on 2 January 2015 and the migrants were being taken by bus to other parts of Italy.

“It’s an extraordinary way to treat people,” said Leonard Doyle, a spokesman for the International Organization for Migration. “The abandonment of ships in the high seas is a very dangerous thing to do at the best of times and takes the smuggling game to a whole new level that we’ve never seen before.”

== See also ==
- Blue Sky M incident
- Timeline of the European migrant crisis
