= Timeline of the 2015 European migrant crisis =

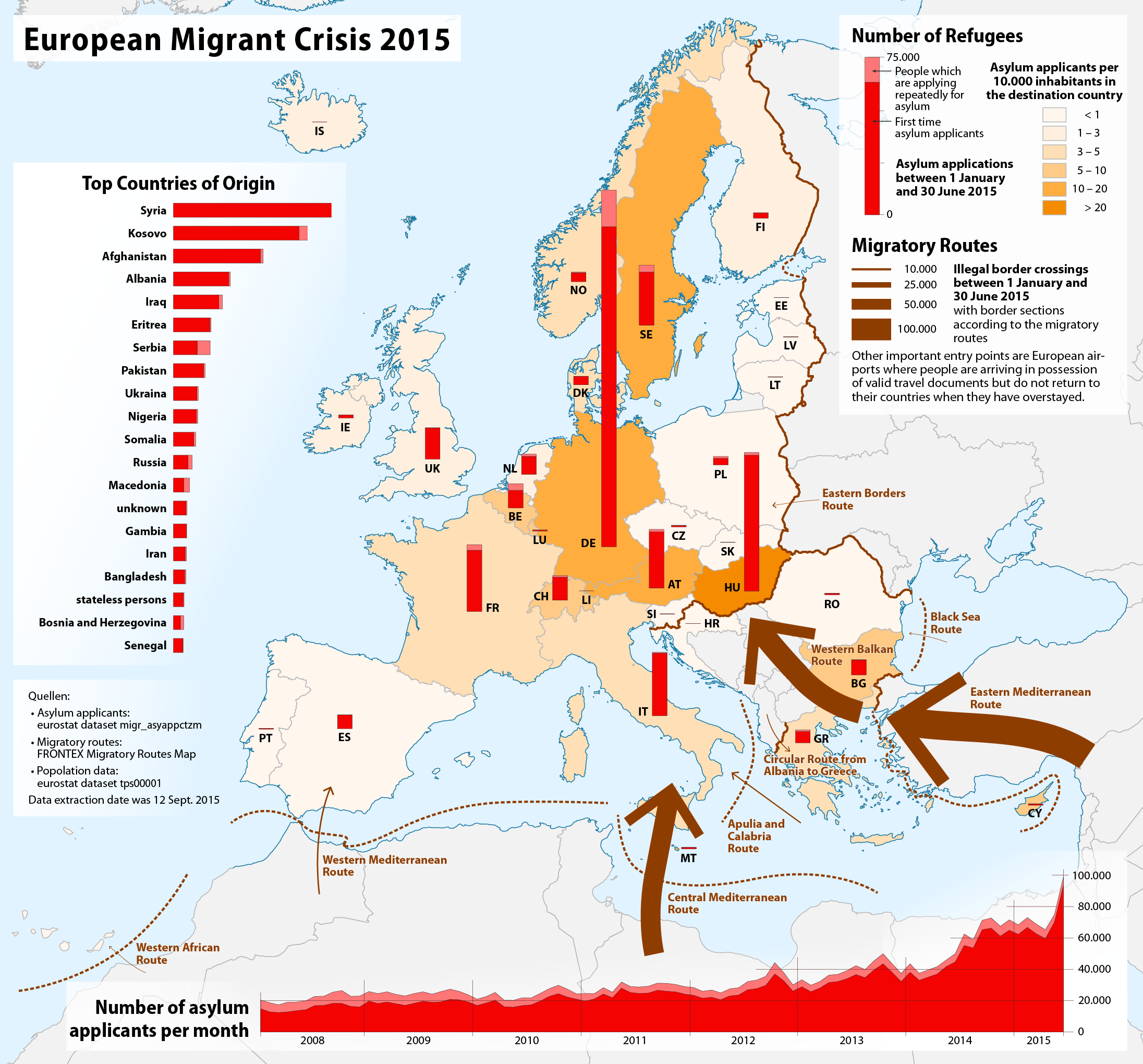
A map of the European migrant crisis in 2015

This is a timeline of the European migrant crisis of 2015 and 2016.

Against the backdrop of four years of Syrian civil war and political instability in other Middle Eastern countries, there was a record number of 1.3 million people who lodged asylum applications to the European Union's 28 member nations, Norway and Switzerland in 2015, compared to 600,000 applications filed in 2014.

In 2015, the European destinations for most of the migrants were Germany, Sweden and Austria. Syria was the country of origin of most displaced persons that year, but many economic refugees also fled Kosovo as their country faced financial hardship in the aftermath of the 1998-1999 Kosovo war. Whereas migrants from Syria, Afghanistan, and Iraq were considered to be genuine refugees with 85% of their applications granted, the latter's were almost always rejected, resulting in fewer asylum applications from the Balkans, including Kosovo, Albania, and Serbia in 2016 onwards.

The surge in numbers in 2015 was accompanied by a significant change in irregular migratory movements as large numbers of migrants, displaced persons, and asylum seekers attempted to enter Europe by both land and sea, bypassing regular migration. Previously most irregular migration consisted of migrants from the African continent crossing the Mediterranean to Italy and onward to other European countries.

In 2016, the number was only slightly less—with 1.2 million asylum applications filed. From Syria alone, millions of people were dislocated in the "humanitarian catastrophe" that affected many Middle Eastern and European nations and beyond.

In 2017, the number of applications decreased dramatically to a total of 706,913 to these destination countries, 40% of which were granted. In 2017, Germany, Italy, and Greece received the most first-time asylum applications. Deutsche Welle (DW) said that some of the likely causes of this decrease included the November 2015 deal made between Turkey and the EU to stem the flow of Syrian refugees into Europe, the closure of the easiest and safest route—the Balkan inland route, as well as intensified efforts by Italy to stop migrants attempting to make the shorter sea crossing from northern Africa to Italy.

In 2022, the number of first-time applicants rose to approximately 996,000—the highest since the Syrian war-related 2015 and 2016 peak numbers. As of August 2023 Syrians continued to attempt to escape their home country through the Eastern Mediterranean route, through Libya and then by boat to Europe. According to the Agence France-Presse (AFP) service, the repression of peaceful pro-democracy protests in 2013 in Syria resulted in the ongoing conflict, millions of displaced persons, and hundred of thousands of deaths by 2022.

The United Nations High Commissioner for Refugees (UNHCR) reported in March 2023 that the world's largest refugee crisis continues to be Syria.

== Overview ==
A 2016 International Monetary Fund (IMF) report described how Europe's "unprecedented surge in asylum applications" peaked in 2015 as the Middle-East was plagued by civil war and political instability. In 2015, the main destination countries were Germany, Sweden and Austria, and the top countries from which the migrants originated were Syria, Kosovo, Afghanistan, Albania, Iraq, Eritrea, Serbia, and Pakistan. Syria, Iraq, Afghanistan, and Eritrea continued to experience conflicts in 2015.

Of the asylum applications to European nations from January to September in 2015, 222,000 were Syrians, 103,000 were from Afghanistan, and 69,000 were from Iraq, the three countries with the highest likelihood of being accepted as genuine refugees and therefore more likely to be granted asylum status in Europe. Most Balkan asylum seekers were rejected and the number of applicants decreased in 2016. Those from Syria, Iraq were accepted at a rate of 85%.

The EEA and Switzerland received 2.3 million applications for asylum from 2009 to September 2015. There is often a time lag between the number of asylum applications lodged and the number of asylum seekers in a host country.

The United Nations High Commissioner for Refugees (UNHCR) reported in March 2023 that the world's largest refugee crisis continues to be Syria because of the ongoing conflicts since 2011. Of the 14 million displaced, 6.8 million Syrians continued to be internally displaced with many still needing assistance. As of 2023, Germany with 850,000 Syrian refugees, was the EU nation with the largest number, while Türkiye, Lebanon, Jordan, Iraq and Egypt also hosted 5.5 million. Syrian refugees lodged asylum applications in more than 130 nations.

According to the UNHCR, As of November 2015 from the beginning of the 2011 Syrian conflict, there were more than 4 million Syrian refugees mainly living in Turkey, Iraq, Jordan, Lebanon and Egypt.

== 2011 ==
=== October 2011 ===
The Greek government began the construction of a fence on the 125 mile Greece–Turkey land border which was completed in December 2012. Prior to its construction the northern Greece border along the Evros River provided the shortest and safest route for migrants to enter Europe.

== 2014 ==
Most migrants from the African countries crossed the Mediterranean Sea by boat to reach Italy and then moved onward to other European countries, according to the European Commission's European Migration Network (EMN).

- 11 September: 2014 Malta migrant shipwreck A migrant boat with more than 500 people on board sank near Malta; nine survivors were rescued.
- 14 September: 2014 Libya migrant shipwreck A migrant boat with up to 250 people on board sank near the coast of Libya; 36 people were rescued.

== 2015 ==
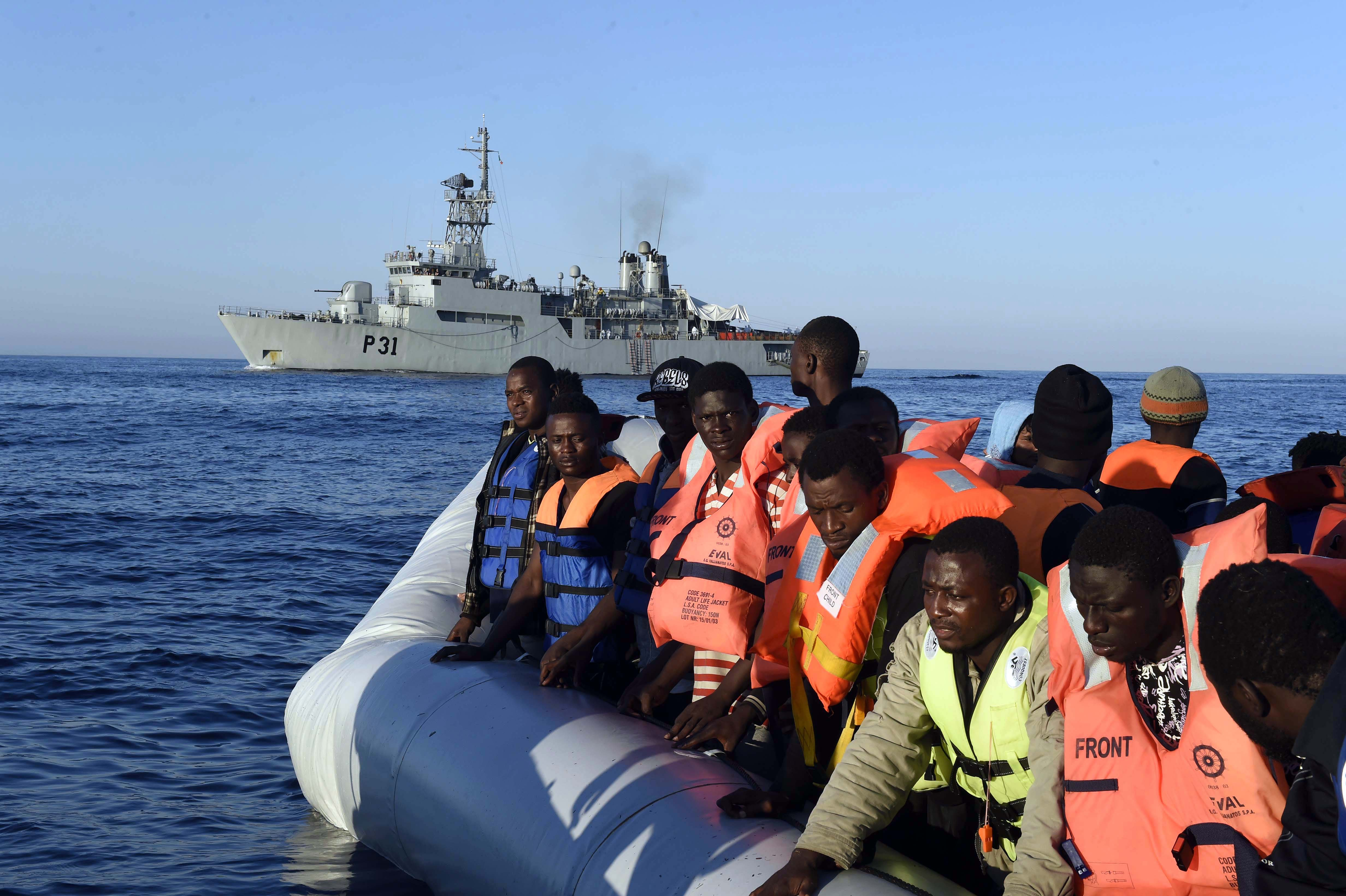
Migrants crossing the Mediterranean from North Africa

The Europol Monitoring Team (EPTM) reported that there were 354,618 arrivals by sea to Europe from 1 January to 28 August in 2015 and 272, 070 during the same time frame in 2016, based on data from the International Organization for Migration.

InfoMigrants reported the number of migrants by the main land and sea routes in 2015, which included the Central Mediterranean from North Africa (153,900), Eastern Mediterranean (885,400), Western Balkan (764,000), Western Mediterranean (7,000), and the Eastern Land Border (1,900). The same report said that the Central Mediterranean route had been the "most popular migration route to Europe" since 2015.

=== January 2015 ===
- 2 January: A ship, the Ezadeen, was rescued off the coast of Italy with 360 Syrian migrants on board. The crew, believed to be people smugglers, abandoned the ship and it had been drifting in the Mediterranean for weeks.
- 23 January: Local Hungarian Mayor of Ásotthalom László Toroczkai has an idea to have a border fence built along the southern border of Hungary, in order to stop illegal migration, which was later implemented as the Hungarian border barrier the same year by the Hungarian government.

=== February 2015 ===
- 9 February: At least 300 migrants are believed to have drowned after four inflatable boats sank off the coast of Libya.

=== March 2015 ===
- 3 March: Ten migrants drowned when their boat capsized off the coast of Libya. Italian coastguard ships rescued almost 1,000 others over a 24-hour period.

=== April 2015 ===
- 12 April: A boat with up to 550 migrants on board capsized off the coast of Libya. About 400 people are believed to have drowned while about 150 were rescued by the Italian coastguard.
- 16 April: About 40 migrants drowned when a boat sank off the coast of Libya. Meanwhile, twelve Christian migrants drowned after Muslim migrants threw them overboard following a row on another migrant boat. There were about 150 migrants on board, heading from Libya to Italy. Italian police arrested fifteen Muslim migrants and charged them with "multiple aggravated murder motivated by religious hate".
- 18 April: A boat with up to 700 migrants on board capsized in Libyan waters south of the Italian island of Lampedusa. At least 650 migrants are believed to have drowned while 28 were rescued by the Italian coastguard. It was the highest death toll from a shipwreck during the migrant crisis. The ship was later displayed at the 2019 Venice Biennale as Barca Nostra.
- 22 April: Fourteen migrants were killed when they were hit by a train near Veles, Macedonia. A large group of Somali and Afghan migrants making their way to western Europe were walking along the track.

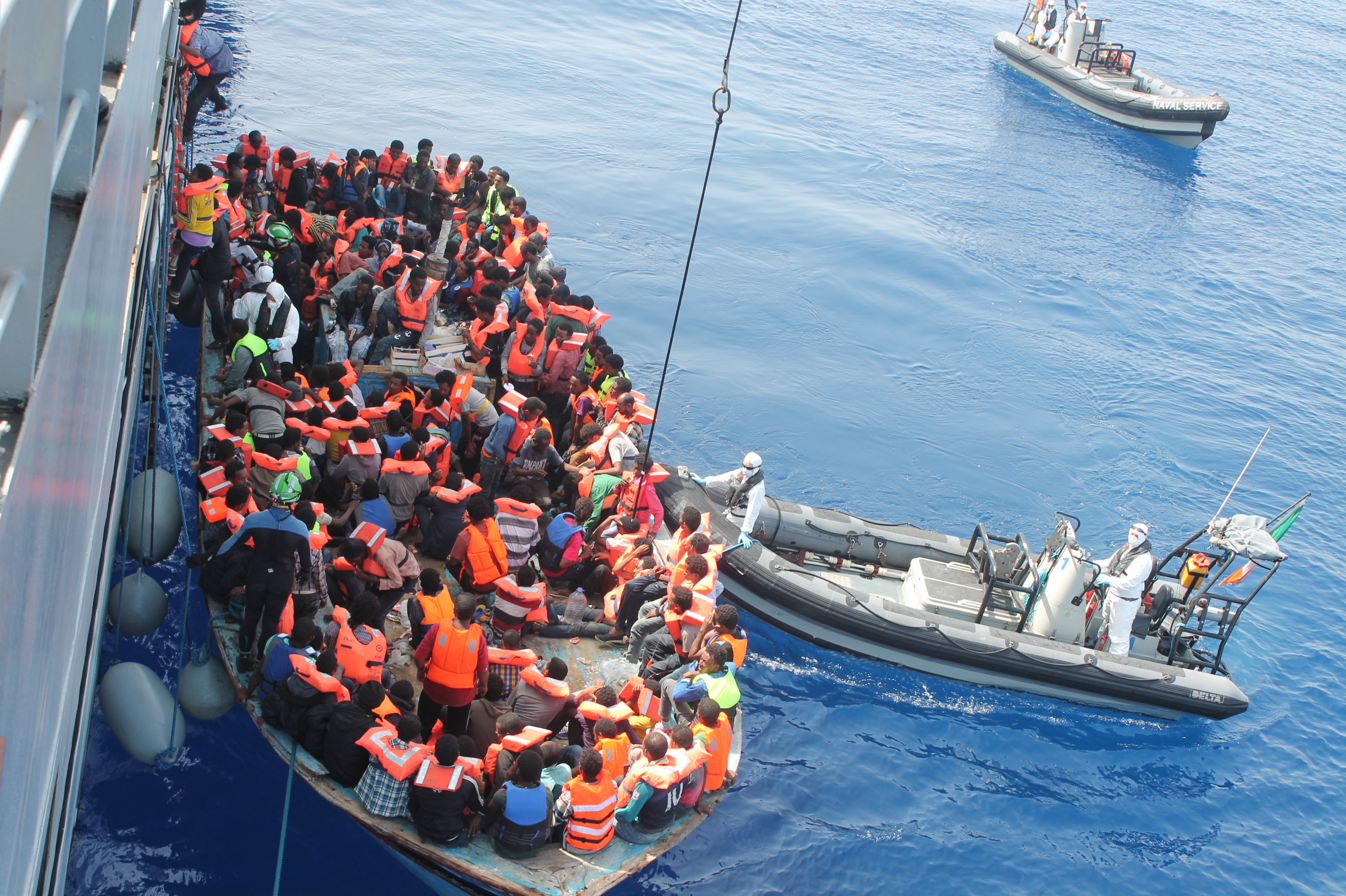
Irish Naval personnel from the LÉ Eithne rescuing migrants in the Mediterranean, June 2015

- 23 April: The European Council held an emergency meeting to discuss the migrant crisis. It agreed to triple funding for rescue operations aimed at migrant boats, and several EU member states promised more ships and other resources. It also agreed to look at ways to capture and destroy smugglers' boats before they can be launched, and to deploy immigration officers to non-EU countries.

=== May 2015 ===
- 4 May: A boat with more than 130 migrants on board sank off the coast of Sicily. Up to 40 are believed to have drowned while the rest were rescued by a Maltese merchant ship.
- 11 May: The European Commission proposed that EU member states should take in refugees under a quota scheme. Countries which had received large numbers of migrants and asylum applications – such as Italy, Malta and Germany – supported the proposal. Others such as Austria, Hungary, Slovakia and Estonia opposed it.

=== June 2015 ===
- 17 June: the Hungarian cabinet approves construction of a 4 metres (13 ft) high barrier (Hungarian border barrier).
- 26 June: At a meeting of the European Council, it was agreed to relocate 40,000 migrants from Italy and Greece to other EU member states. It was also agreed to take in another 20,000 refugees from outside the EU. It was announced that the relocation scheme would be voluntary and there would be no mandatory quotas for each country. New figures from the UN Refugee Agency showed that 63,000 migrants had arrived in Greece and 62,000 in Italy during the first half of 2015.

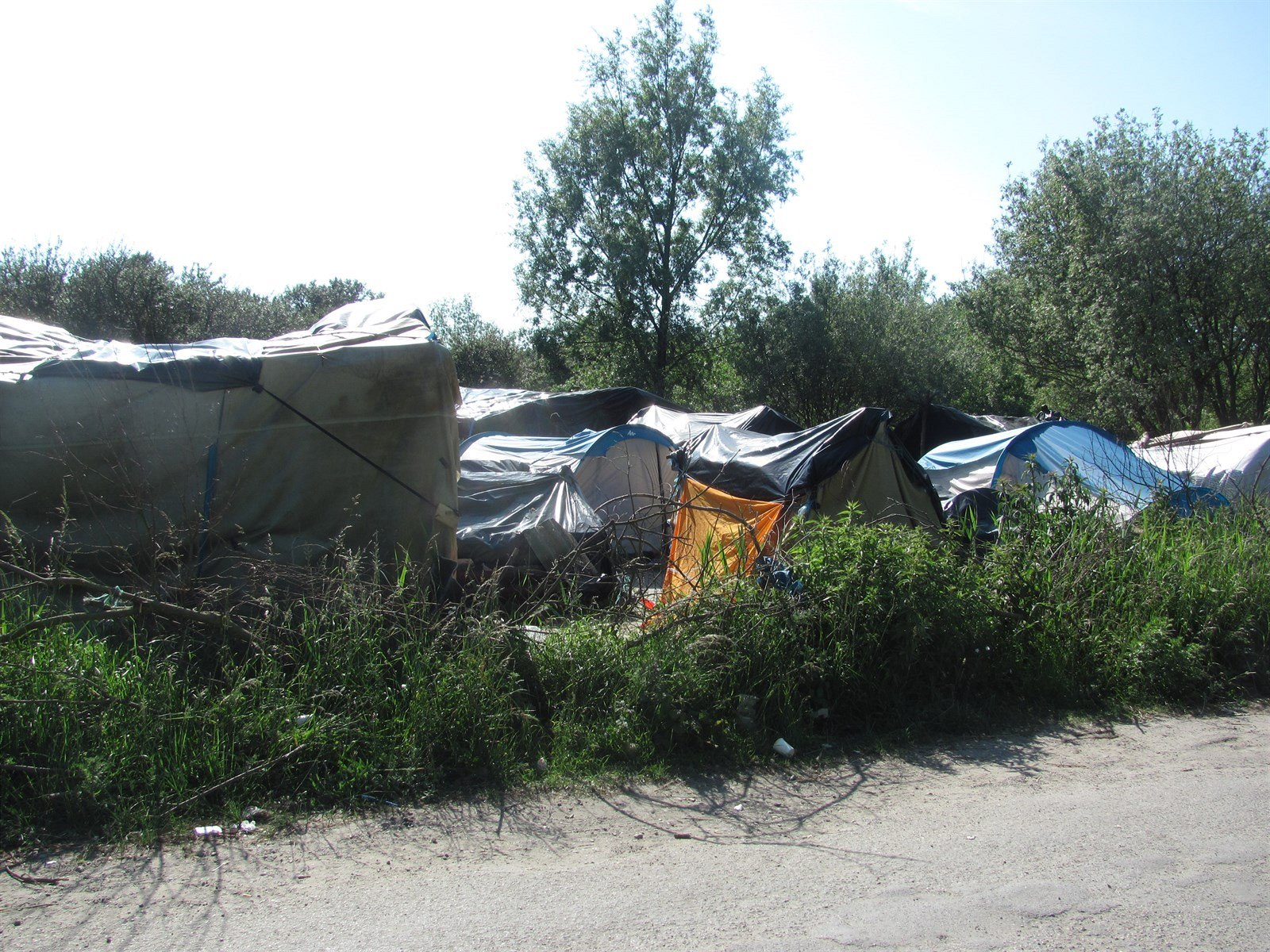
The 'Calais Jungle' migrant camp

- 23/24 and 29/30 June: A strike by ferry workers caused major traffic jams in Calais, France. Hundreds of migrants camped nearby exploited the situation by trying to break into lorries bound for Britain. This led to clashes with police, who used batons and pepper spray to hold back the migrants. Some lorry drivers were threatened by migrants wielding knives and iron bars. The disruption forced the closure of the ferry port and the Channel Tunnel.
- 27 June: The United Kingdom announced that it would begin building more than two miles of high-security fencing at the Channel Tunnel port in Calais, in an attempt to stop thousands of migrants breaking into lorries bound for Britain.

=== July 2015 ===
- 1 July In a 1 July 2015 report the UNHCR UK described the situation in Europe as a "maritime refugee crisis of historic proportions." The report described a significant increase in migrants from Syria, Afghanistan, Iraq and Somalia travelling from Turkey to Greece on the eastern Mediterranean route fleeing war torn countries. Their destination countries were in western and northern Europe so they continued their journey from Greece through the Balkans. Italy which was the country where most migrants landed in 2014, continued to be the first destination for people from sub-Saharan countries, and Eritrea and Somalia.
- 9 July: Twelve migrants drowned when their overcrowded dinghy sank off the coast of Libya. The Italian coastguard rescued 106 others.
- 13 July: Hungary began building a barrier along its border with Serbia.

=== August 2015 ===
- 4 August: Bulgaria began building a new section of razor wire fence along its border with Turkey to stop migrants entering the country illegally. It is the final portion of the fence, which began construction in November 2013 and will completely seal the border.
- 5 August: A boat carrying between 400 and 600 migrants sank off the coast of Libya. Almost 400 were rescued by an Irish Navy vessel and 25 bodies were recovered.
- 8 August: At least 11 people were killed and 29 injured when an overcrowded minibus they were traveling in crashed near Balıkesir, Turkey. They were Syrian migrants believed to be on their way to the coast in an attempt to reach Greece.
- 15 August: At least 40 migrants died in the hold of an overcrowded boat off the coast of Libya. They were killed by fumes from the engine; 320 others were rescued by the Italian Navy.
- 20–22 August: Macedonia sealed its southern border with Greece and declared a state of emergency to help it cope with a large influx of migrants, as the numbers trying to enter Macedonia rose to more than 3,000 a day. Thousands of migrants massed on the border and tried to force their way past lines of Macedonian police. Police responded with tear gas and stun grenades and forced some of them back with batons.
- 24 August
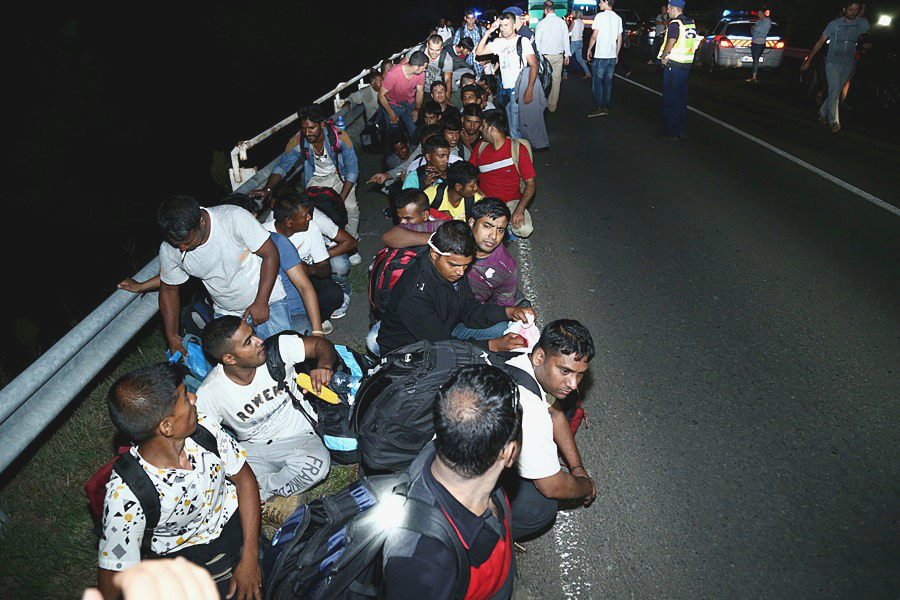
  Migrants along the Western Balkan route crossing from Serbia into Hungary, 24 August 2015
- 22 August: About 4,400 migrants were rescued from boats off the coast of Libya, in one of the biggest such rescue operations up until then. The Italian coastguard received distress calls from more than 20 vessels.
- 25 August: About 50 migrants died of asphyxiation in the hold of an overcrowded boat off the coast of Libya. About 430 others were rescued by a Swedish coastguard ship.
- 27 August: About 200 migrants are believed to have drowned after two boats sank off the coast of Zuwarah, Libya. Almost 200 others were rescued by the Libyan coastguard.
- 27 August: The bodies of 71 migrants (including four children), thought to be Syrian refugees, were found in a lorry abandoned on the A4 motorway in Austria. They are believed to have suffocated as the lorry drove through Hungary.
- 30 August: At least 37 migrants drowned when their boat sank off the coast of Al Khums, Libya.

=== September 2015 ===
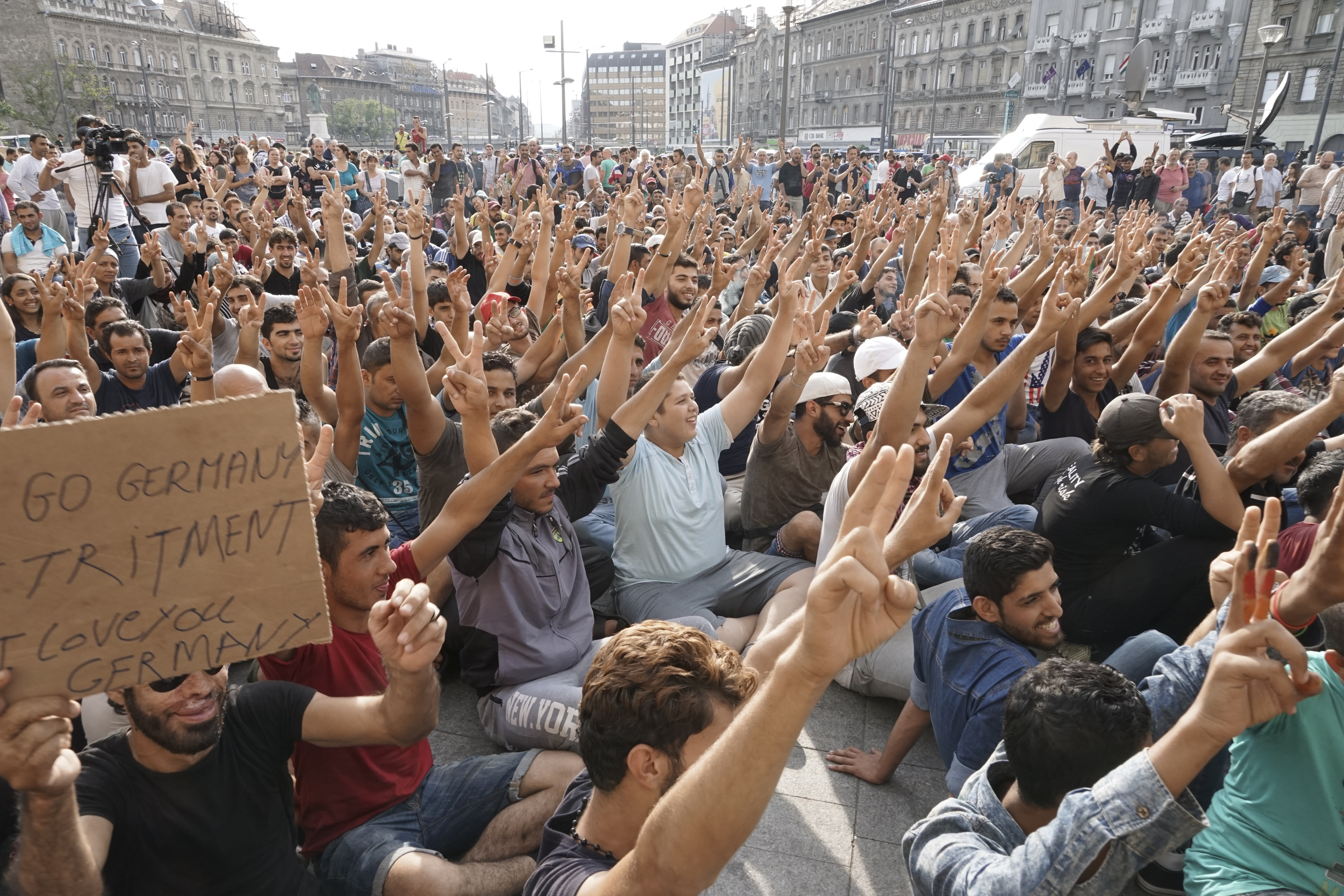
Migrants protesting outside Keleti railway station, Budapest, 3 September 2015

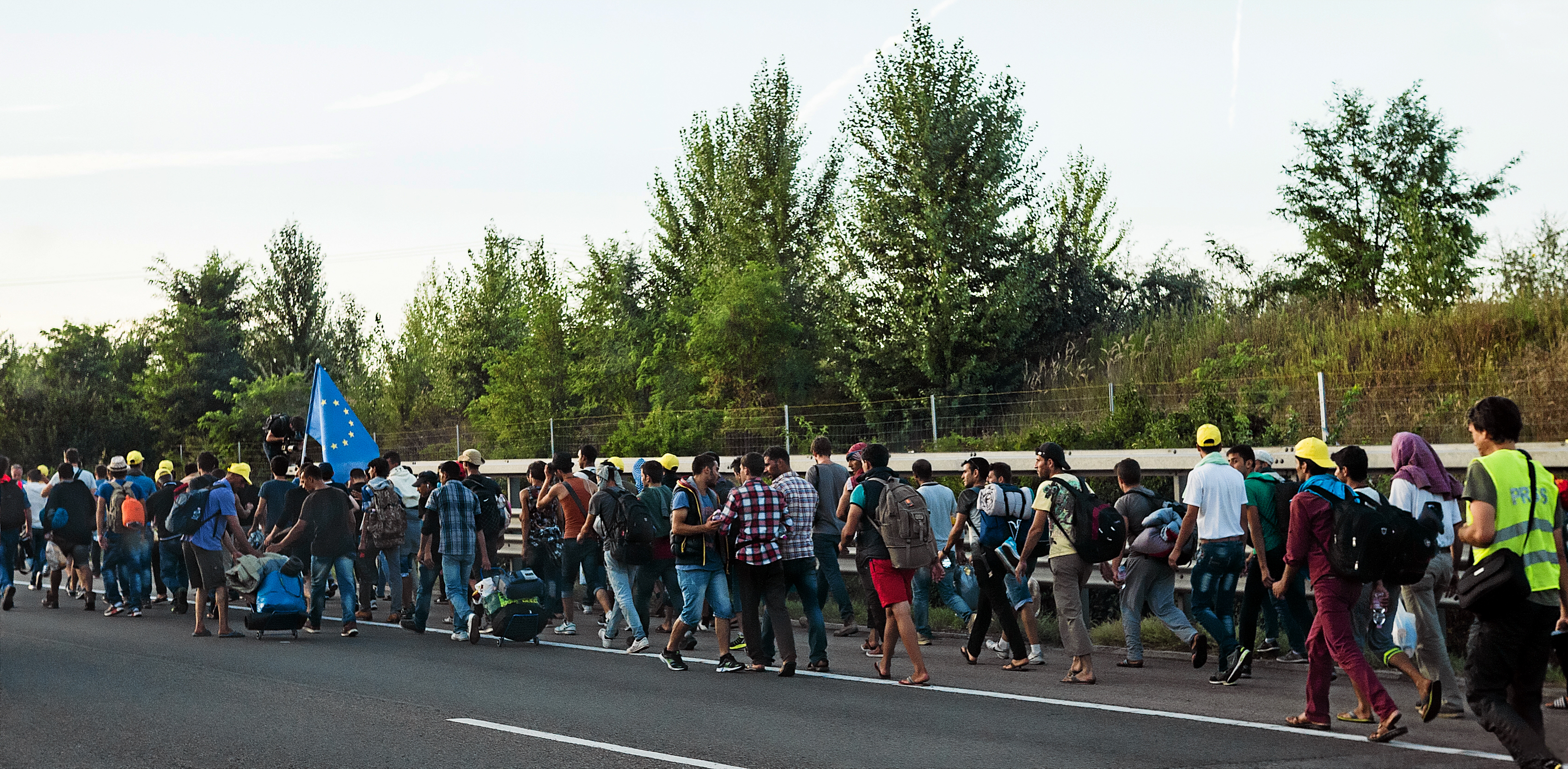
Migrants walking along the motorway from Hungary to Austria, 4 September 2015

By September 2015, 901,000 asylum applications had been lodged in the European Economic Area (EEA) representing a significant increase over the same time period in 2013, in which there were 451,000 applications. From January to September 2015, an estimated 380,000 Syrian migrants arrived in the EU with over sixty per cent taking the Eastern Mediterranean route to Greece. By a large majority, most did not lodge asylum applications in Greece, but continued to Germany, Hungary, or Sweden.

- 1–5 September: Thousands of migrants gathered outside Keleti railway station in the Hungarian capital, Budapest, after police sealed off the terminal to stop them travelling through the EU. The Hungarian government said it was trying to enforce EU law (the Dublin Regulation), which states that refugees should seek asylum in the first EU country they enter. However, the migrants wanted to claim asylum in Germany. For four days, the migrants camped outside the station and were in a stand-off with police. Eventually, hundreds began walking along the motorway to the Austrian border. The Austrian chancellor said Austria and Germany had agreed to let the migrants cross their borders. The Hungarian government abandoned attempts to register the migrants and sent buses to bring them to the border. Some Austrians and Germans gathered to welcome the migrants. A convoy of 140 cars driven by German and Austrian activists also crossed into Hungary to pick up migrants.
- 2 September: Death of Alan Kurdi
- 5 September: German Chancellor, Angela Merkel, announced that there are "no limits on the number of asylum seekers" Germany will take in. She said that "as a strong, economically healthy country we have the strength to do what is necessary".
- 8 September: Hundreds of migrants broke through police lines on Hungary's border with Serbia and began walking towards the capital, Budapest. The migrants had earlier broken out of a registration camp at Röszke. They threw stones at officers, who responded with pepper spray. About 300 migrants ran on to a nearby motorway, chanting "Germany, Germany".
- 9 September: Hundreds of migrants, attempting to travel by train from Germany to Sweden, were stopped by police when they entered Denmark. About 200 migrants refused to leave the trains, while about 300 began walking along the E45 motorway towards Sweden. Danish police were forced to close the motorway and suspend all rail links with Germany. The migrants did not want to be registered in Denmark because the government cut benefits for new arrivals and restricted the right to residency, while Sweden promised to issue residency papers to all Syrian asylum seekers.
- 12 September: Tens of thousands took part in demonstrations in support of refugees and migrants in several European cities. In London, tens of thousands, some carrying placards that read "Open the Borders" and "Refugees In", marched towards the prime minister's residence. About 30,000 rallied outside the Danish parliament in Copenhagen, chanting "Say it loud and say it clear, refugees are welcome here". Other rallies were held in Sweden, France, Austria and the Netherlands. Meanwhile, thousands also took part in demonstrations against mass immigration in Warsaw, Prague, and Bratislava.
- 13 September: At least 34 migrants, including 15 children, drowned when their overcrowded boat capsized in high winds off the Greek island of Farmakonisi.

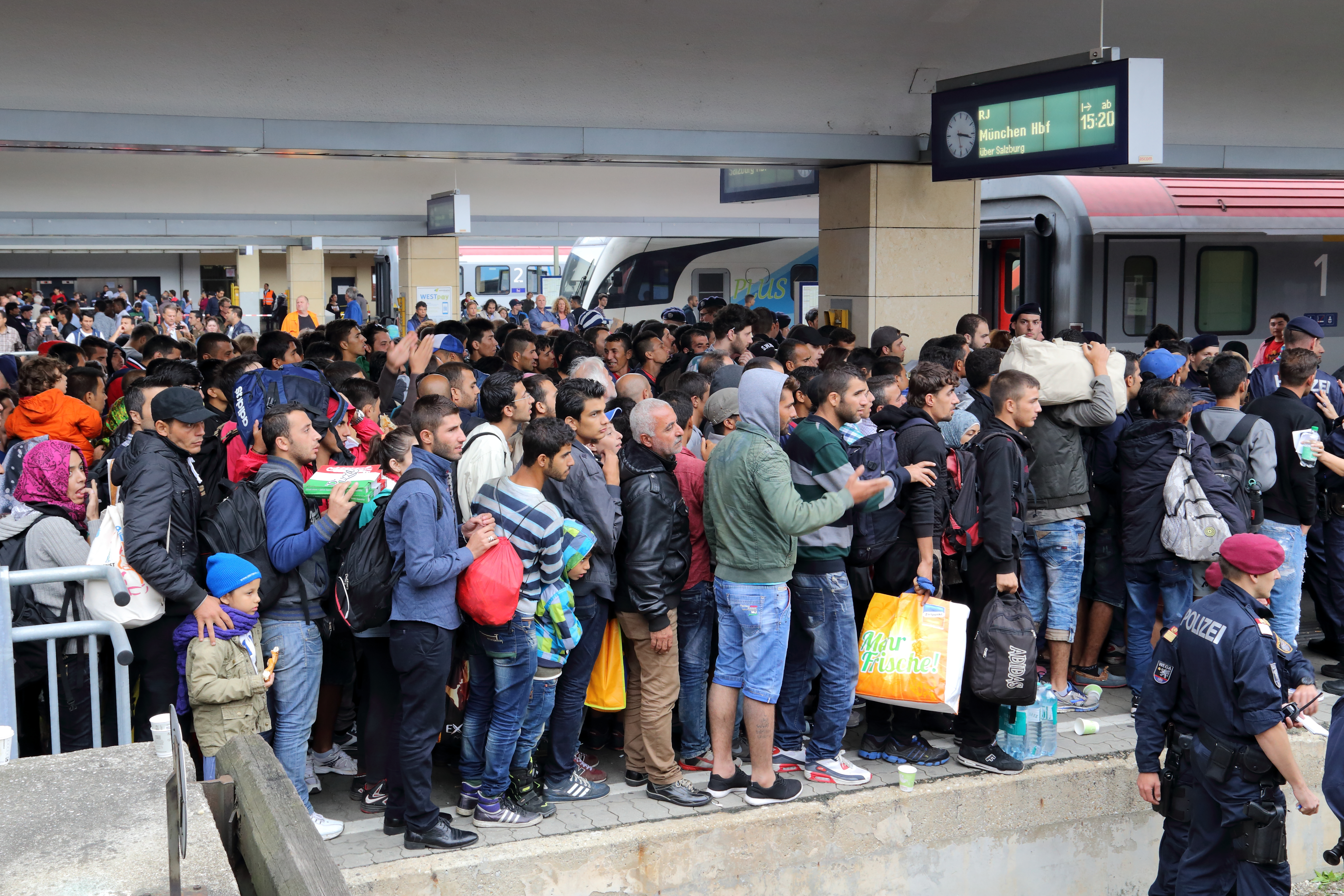
Migrants at Wien Westbahnhof railway station, Austria, on their way to Germany

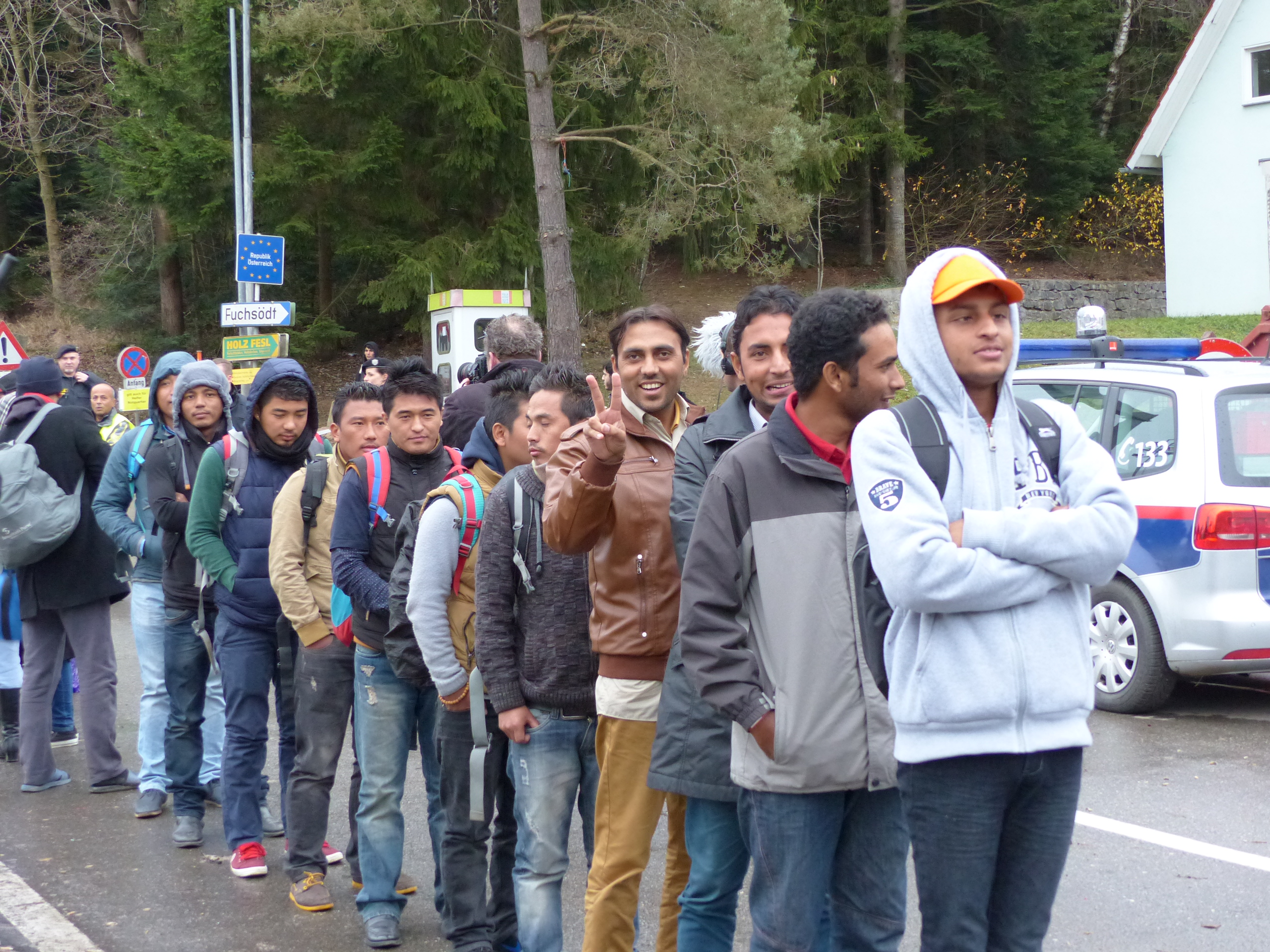
Migrants at the Austria-Germany border

- 13 September: Germany introduced temporary controls on its border with Austria to cope with the inflow of migrants. Trains between Germany and Austria were suspended for 12 hours. Germany's vice-chancellor said the country was "at the limit of its capabilities" as more than 13,000 migrants arrived in Munich in one day, and 40,000 were expected to arrive in Germany over the following weekend.
- 14 September: Austria introduced controls on its border with Hungary and deployed the Austrian Army to the border to help cope with the inflow of migrants.
- 15 September: Hungary closed its border with Serbia and declared a state of emergency in two southern counties as new laws to stop migrants entering illegally came into force. The laws made it a crime to cross the border illegally and to damage the newly built fence along the Hungary–Serbia border. There was a standoff as hundreds of migrants massed at the fence, some throwing down food and water in protest at not being allowed through. Shortly after, Hungary began building a barrier along its border with Croatia.
- 16 September: Hundreds of migrants tried to break through the fence on the Hungary-Serbia border at Horgoš and threw stones at Hungarian police. They responded with tear gas and water cannon. The Hungarian government said 20 officers were injured and accused migrants of using children as "human shields".
- 17 September: Croatia closed seven of its eight road border crossings with Serbia following a huge inflow of migrants. Officials said they had no choice after more than 13,000 entered the country since the Hungary-Serbia border was closed. Slovenia also introduced temporary controls on its border with Hungary to cope with a potential inflow of migrants.
- 20 September: At least 13 migrants – six of them children – drowned off the coast of Çanakkale, Turkey, after their inflatable dinghy was hit by a Turkish ship.
- 22 September: EU interior ministers meeting in the Justice and Home Affairs Council voted by a majority to relocate 120,000 refugees EU-wide. The Czech Republic, Hungary, Romania and Slovakia voted against the plan, but they were overruled. The idea was to distribute 120,000 refugees over two years from Greece and Italy. The scheme will only apply to refugees most in need of international protection; not economic migrants. The European Commission proposed that the scheme be mandatory for EU member states.
- 27 September: Seventeen Syrian migrants, including five children, drowned when their boat sank off the coast of Bodrum, Turkey.

=== October 2015 ===
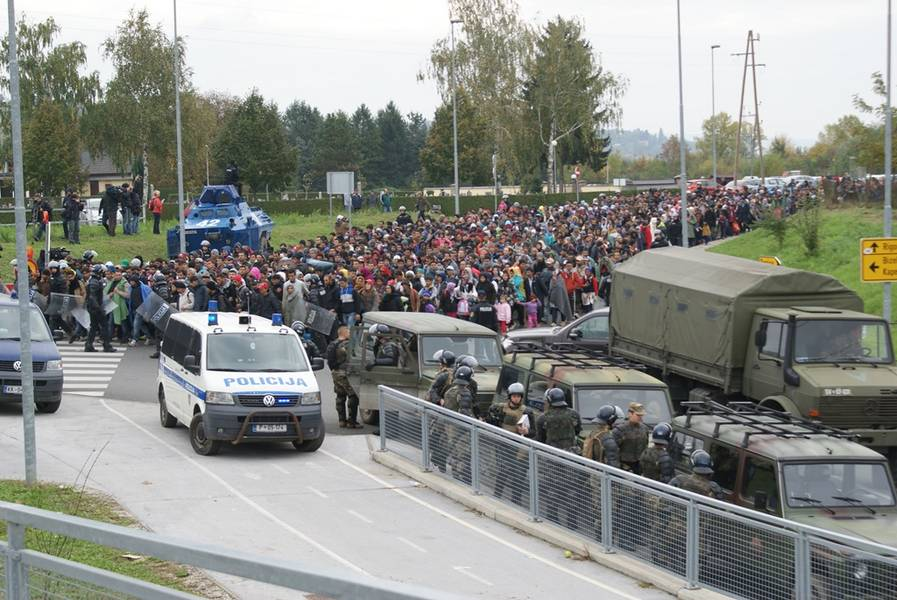
Arrival of migrants in Dobova, Slovenia, 22 October 2015

- 7 October: The EU began a new operation in the southern Mediterranean to intercept boats smuggling migrants. Under Operation Sophia, naval vessels will be able to board, search, seize and divert vessels suspected of being used for people smuggling. Until then, the EU had focused on surveillance and rescue operations.
- 15 October: The European Council backed an action plan with Turkey to ease the flow of migrants to Europe.
- 16 October: Hungary announced that it had completed a fence along its 348 km (216 mi) border with Croatia and would close the border at midnight. This forced migrants to divert to Slovenia. However, Slovenia, with a population of only two million, stated that it would only be able to admit 2,500 people per day, stranding thousands of migrants in Croatia.
- 16 October: An Afghan migrant was shot dead by a Bulgarian border guard near the town of Sredets after entering the country illegally from Turkey. The man was among a group of about 50 Afghans. Bulgarian officials said a warning shot was fired after the migrants resisted arrest and that the man was killed by the ricochet.
- 17 October: At least 12 migrants, including five children, drowned when their boat sank off the coast of Ayvacık, Turkey.
- 22 October: Slovenia called for help from the EU after more than 12,600 migrants, many fleeing Syria, arrived in Slovenia in just 24 hours.
- 25 October: The heads of 11 EU states and three non-EU states held an emergency summit in Brussels to discuss the migrant crisis. It was agreed that 100,000 more spaces would be made in refugee centres and that 400 police officers would be sent to Slovenia to help cope with the inflow. It was reported that more than 9,000 migrants arrived in Greece every day over the foregoing week.

=== November 2015 ===
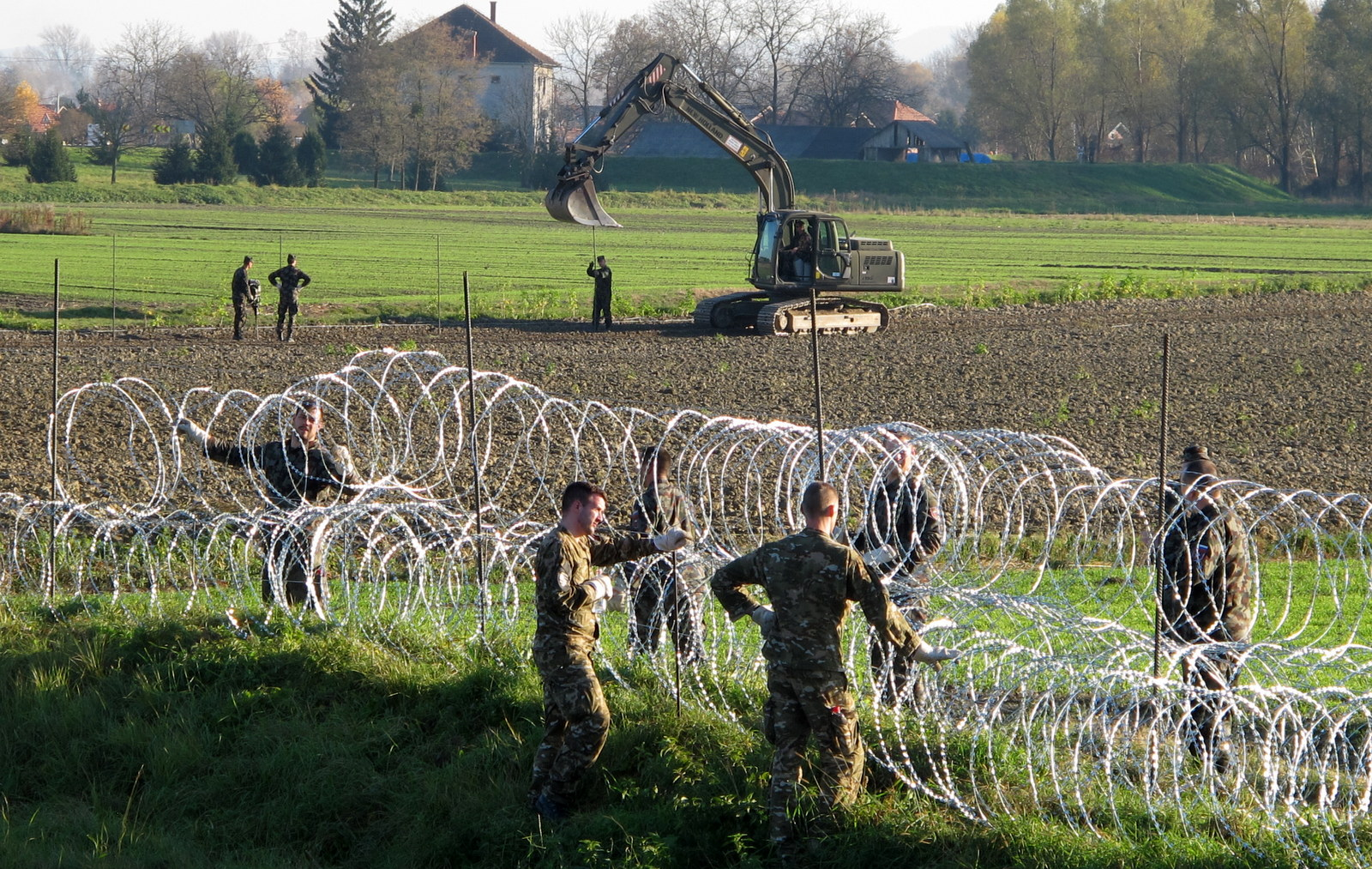
Slovenian soldiers building the barrier on the Croatian border, November 2015

- 5 November: Austria began building a barrier along part of its border with Slovenia, to control the inflow of migrants.
- 11 November: Slovenia began building a barrier along its border with Croatia to control the inflow of migrants.
- 11–12 November: Valletta Summit on Migration – a summit between European and African leaders was held in Valletta, Malta, to discuss the migrant crisis. On 12 November, the leaders signed an agreement to set up an Emergency Trust Fund to help development in African countries as well as to encourage those countries to take back some migrants who arrive in Europe.
- 13 November: Islamic State militants carried out a series of terrorist attacks in Paris, killing 130 civilians. It later emerged that some of the perpetrators had entered Europe among the flow of migrants and refugees. The attacks prompted European officials to re-evaluate their stance toward migrants and border controls, insisting that greater scrutiny was needed in vetting migrants.
- 24 November: Sweden announced that it would be introducing temporary border checks to control the flow of migrants into the country, meaning that none would be allowed to cross the border without identification. It also announced that most refugees would receive only temporary residence permits from April. Prime Minister Stefan Löfven said "It pains me that Sweden is no longer capable of receiving asylum seekers at the high level we do today". Deputy Prime Minister, Åsa Romson, burst into tears as she announced the measures.
- 28 November: Finnish authorities reported that asylum applications had reached more than 30,000 since the start of the year, and that reception centres were quickly running out of room.
- 28 November: Macedonia began building a barrier along part of its border with Greece. There were clashes between migrants and Macedonian riot police, which left up to 40 people injured.
- 29 November In Brussels, the EU and Turkey finalised their agreement which included a €3 billion ($3.2 billion) aid package to Turkey in exchange for stemming the flow of illegal or 'irregular' migration into Europe. In spite of the authoritarian turn Turkey had taken, the accession of Turkey to the European Union was also being reconsidered. In return, the EU will send Turkey €3 billion to help it host refugees and will allow Turkish citizens to travel freely into the Schengen zone by June. The Schengen zone consists of 26 EU nations where border controls were abolished which means people and goods can move freely.

=== December 2015 ===
- 8–9 December: At least 21 migrants, including seven children, drowned when four boats sank off the Greek island of Farmakonisi.
- 16 December: 2015 Geldermalsen riot – 2,000 people protested against plans to build a centre for asylum seekers in the Dutch town of Geldermalsen. There were clashes with police, during which several people were injured and officers fired warning shots.
- 16 December: The Norwegian government created the new cabinet office of Minister of Migration amid record-high numbers of asylum seekers in Norway, having received a total of 30,000 during 2015, which eventually resulted in a broad parliamentary consensus to tighten asylum regulations. The position was filled by Sylvi Listhaug, who vowed to make Norway's asylum policies "one of the strictest in Europe".
- 30 December: The UN refugee agency reported that more than one million migrants and refugees had reached Europe by sea during 2015. More than 80% arrived in Greece from Turkey, while most of the others arrived in Italy from Libya. It recorded that 3,735 had died or were lost at sea.
- 30 December The European Migration Network (EMN) submitted their commissioned report to the European Commission.

== 2016 ==
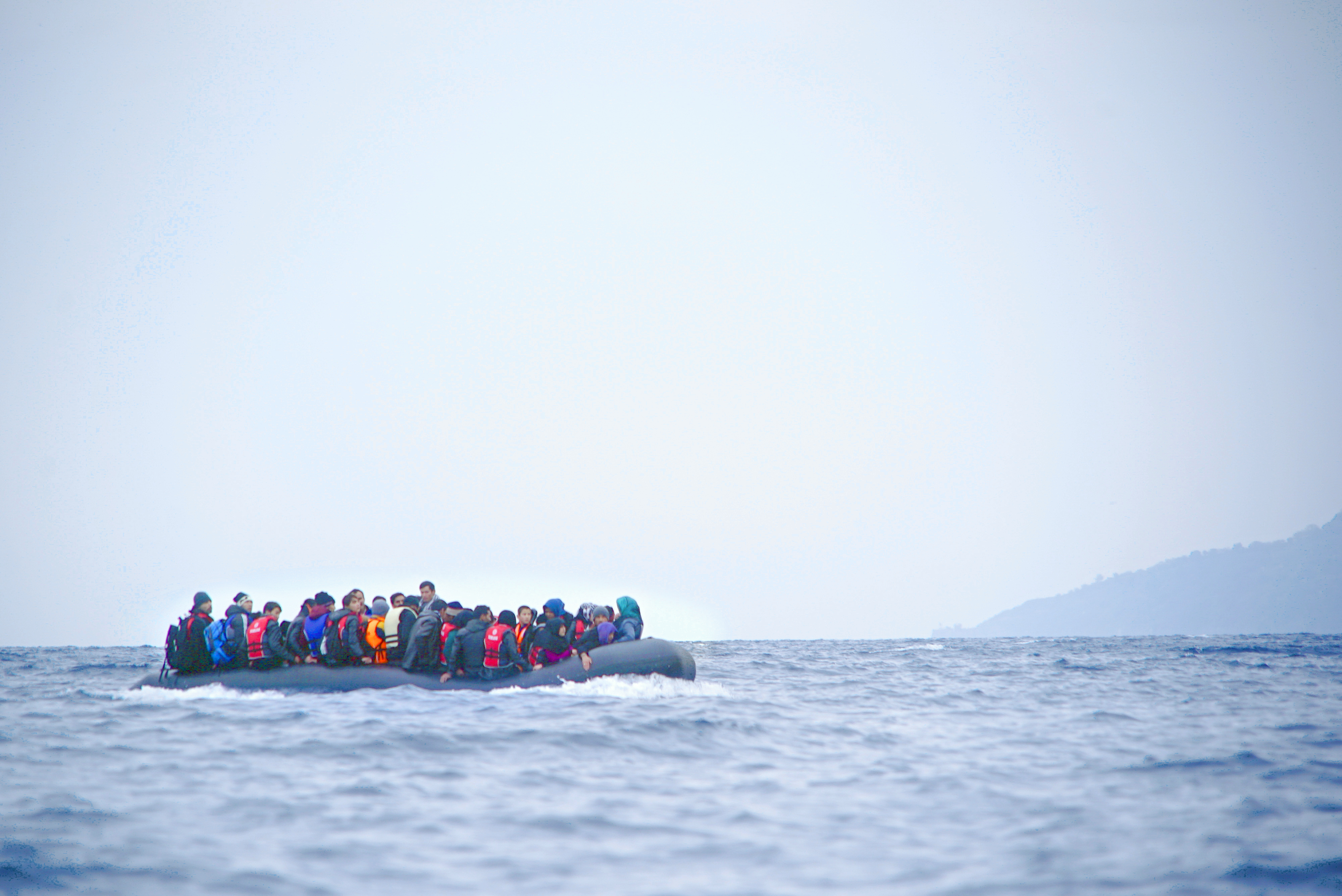
Migrants crossing the Aegean Sea from Turkey to the Greek island of Lesbos, January 2016

Migrant smugglers' primary route into the EU was still the Central Mediterranean Sea. In 2016, 1.2 million asylum applications filed for entrance into EU nations, Norway, and Switzerland. The EPTM reported that there were 272, 070 arrivals by sea to Europe from 1 January to 28 August in 2016, based on IOM data.

=== January 2016 ===
- 1 January: New Year's Eve sexual assaults in Germany – During the 2016 New Year's Eve celebrations, hundreds of sexual assaults, numerous thefts, and at least five rapes were reported in several German cities, mostly in Cologne city centre. The Chief Prosecutor stated that "the overwhelming majority" of suspects were asylum seekers and illegal immigrants who had recently arrived from North Africa and the Middle East. The attacks led to a hardening of attitudes against mass immigration, and fuelled debate about the sustainability of Germany's asylum policy and social differences between European and Islamic countries. The German government also proposed changing the law to make it easier to deport immigrants convicted of crimes.
- 4 January: Sweden introduced checks on its border with Denmark to stem the inflow of migrants. The changes mean that none may cross the border without identification, and transport companies will be fined if travellers do not have valid identification. Sweden's state-owned train operator SJ said it would stop services to and from Denmark because it could not carry out the checks needed. In response, Denmark tightened border controls with Germany.
- 9 January: In Cologne, about 1,700 people joined a PEGIDA demonstration in protest at the New Year's Eve assaults and called for Chancellor Angela Merkel to resign. When police tried to disperse the rally, some protesters threw missiles and police responded by firing tear gas and water cannon. Leftists held a counter-demonstration nearby. The following day, eleven immigrants were beaten by a group of vigilantes in the area where the assaults took place.
- 11 January: Swedish police launched an internal investigation after allegations arose that the police and journalists covered up mass sexual assaults by immigrant youths at a music festival. Shortly after, it emerged that police in Sweden would no longer be allowed to give ethnic descriptions of criminal suspects. This was to avoid pointing out immigrant groups as criminal and to avoid accusations of racism.
- 25 January: Death of Alexandra Mezher – A Swedish woman, Alexandra Mezher, was stabbed to death by an asylum seeker at the Mölndal refugee centre where she worked. The incident led to a marked rise in violence against immigrants and support for far-right groups.
- 26 January: The Danish parliament passed a law allowing the government to seize valuables from asylum seekers to pay for their upkeep. It applies to valuables worth over 10,000 kroner but not those of sentimental value. The law was widely criticized by human rights groups.
- 26 January: A gun battle broke out in the Grande-Synthe migrant camp in northern France. Police believe the fight erupted between rival gangs of people smugglers against a backdrop of tensions between Muslims and Christians in the camp. A senior CRS officer claimed "The Muslims are trying to expel the Christians from the camp".
- 27–28 January: Twenty-six migrants, ten of them children, drowned when their boat capsized off the Greek island of Samos.
- 29 January: In Sweden, up to 100 black-clad masked men marched to Stockholm Central Station and attacked young immigrants. They handed out leaflets claiming the immigrants had regularly been assaulting and robbing people at the station, and called for action against immigrant crime. This led to clashes with police.

=== February 2016 ===
- 6 February: The Turkish Foreign Ministry announced tighter visa restrictions on Iraqi citizens going to Turkey as a sign of determination to combat illegal immigration to Europe. Previously, Iraqis were allowed to enter Turkey visa-free for 30 days. Now, they are required to pre-apply for either an electronic or a paper visa to enter the country.
- 7 February: At least 27 migrants, including 11 children, drowned when their boat capsized in the Gulf of Edremit, Turkey.
- 9 & 14 February: On the Greek island of Kos, hundreds of locals protested against the building of a screening centre for migrants and refugees. There were clashes with police, who fired tear gas and stun grenades. Petrol bombs were also thrown at officers, and a homemade bomb exploded outside the police station.
- 11 February: Turkish President, Recep Tayyip Erdoğan, threatened to send millions of refugees from Turkey into the EU unless Turkey is given more funds to host the refugees. Meanwhile, NATO agreed to send a patrol of three ships to the Aegean to intercept migrants trying to reach Greece and to send them back to Turkey.
- 15 February: Leaders of the Visegrád Group met with their counterparts from Bulgaria and Macedonia in Prague and announced that the Balkan route should be closed on the Greek-Macedonian border by mid March, if Greece fails to protect its southern border. Visegrad countries will help Macedonia and other Balkan countries with protection of their borders.
- 15 February: Bulgaria announced that it will close all its external EU borders and deport anyone who does not meet the criteria for asylum.
- 17 February: Austria announced that it will introduce checks on its border with Hungary, Slovenia and Italy to stem the inflow of migrants. It also announced it will set a daily cap on the number of asylum seekers allowed to enter the country and limit daily asylum claims. The EU's Migration Commissioner said the cap on asylum claims would break EU and international law.
- 23 February: Belgium introduced temporary controls on its border with France to prevent a potential inflow of UK-bound migrants from the Calais migrant camps.
- 23 February: Norwegian Prime Minister Erna Solberg proposed force majeure emergency legislation that would allow rejecting all asylum seekers coming to Norway. The measures, which would break international law, would be implemented in the case of a "complete breakdown" of neighbouring Sweden's asylum system.
- 24 February: The Hungarian government announced that it will hold a referendum on the EU's mandatory migrant quotas. The European Commission criticized the decision, while European Parliament president Martin Schulz condemned it as a "populist and nationalist response to a global challenge".
- 25 February: Greece recalled its ambassador to Austria amid sharp divisions over the migrant crisis. Meanwhile, the EU's Migration Commissioner warned that the EU's migration system could "completely break down" within weeks.
- 26 February: Two Pakistani migrants tried to publicly hang themselves in front of onlookers in the centre of Athens, in protest at being stranded in Greece.
- 29 February: There were clashes as French authorities began demolishing part of the 'Calais Jungle' migrant camp. Migrants and 'No Borders' activists threw stones and set shacks ablaze while about 150 migrants, some wielding iron bars, ran onto the road to block vehicles. Riot police responded with tear gas. The government wanted to move migrants to official accommodation made from converted shipping containers, but most refused, fearing they would be forced to claim asylum in France rather than Britain.

=== March 2016 ===
- 2 March: NATO's Supreme Commander in Europe claimed that Russia and the Assad regime in Syria were using mass migration as an "aggressive strategy against Europe".
- 5 March: Twenty-five migrants drowned when their boat sank off the coast of Didim, Turkey.
- 7 March: Several hundred residents of Calais held a protest in Paris against the "economic catastrophe" in their town, which they say has been caused by the migrant crisis there.
- 7 March: Police in Östersund, Sweden, warned women not to go out alone at night, after a spate of sexual assaults against women and girls by immigrant men. The warning was criticized by the city's Social Democrat mayor and others.
- 9 March: Balkan countries announced tighter restrictions on migrant entry, in a bid to close the 'Balkan route'. Slovenia, Croatia, Serbia and Macedonia announced that only migrants who plan to seek asylum in the country, or those with clear humanitarian needs will be allowed entry and that those without valid documents will be turned back. Hungary declared a state of emergency due to the migrant crisis, and deployed additional police and military at the borders. German Chancellor Angela Merkel condemned the "unilateral" closure of the Balkan route.
- 12 March: In Berlin, about 3,000 people took part in a protest march against the German government's 'open door' asylum policy. It drew ten times more protesters than police had expected. The march was met by a 1,000-strong counter-demonstration.
- 12 March: In Calais, more than 130 activists from the Identitarian movement blocked roads leading from migrant camps to the town centre. The activists set up barricades, burnt tyres and carried banners with slogans such as 'Defend Calais'. There were clashes as riot police forcibly dispersed the activists and 14 arrests were made.
- 13 March: The right-wing nationalist party Alternative for Germany (AFD) made strong gains in German state elections. The party campaigned against mass immigration and the German government's 'open door' asylum policy.
- 20 March: The EU and Turkey 29 November agreement came into effect, which meant that any irregular migrants that arrived in Greece but did not submit an asylum application would be returned to Turkey. One Syrian refugee in Turkey would be resettled in the EU in exchange for Turkey taking back one refugee from Greece. Turkey will take tougher action to prevent illegal migration.

=== April 2016 ===
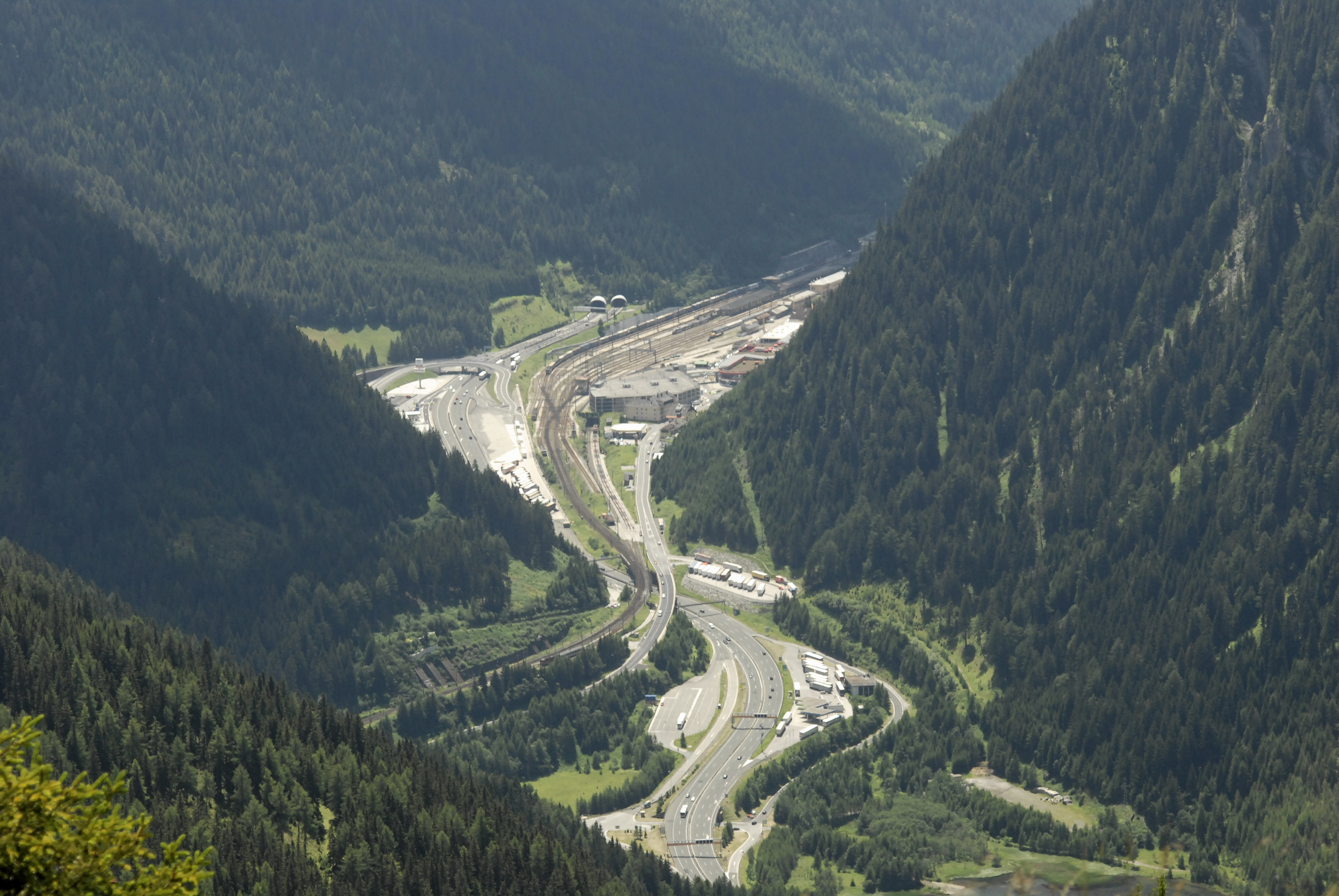
The Brenner Pass, on the Italy–Austria border

- 3 April: Hundreds of 'No Borders' activists protested at the Brenner Pass, on the Italy–Austria border, against Austria's plans for stricter border controls. Clashes broke out when activists tried to march into Austria. Some threw stones at Austrian police and tried to break through police lines. Austrian police forced them back with batons, shields and pepper spray. Ten protesters and five police were injured.
- 6 April: Migrants protested at the Port of Piraeus in Greece when authorities tried to move them from a makeshift camp to official migrant shelters. One migrant threatened to throw a baby at police after they tried to stop him from smashing a car.
- 10 April: Clashes erupted at the Idomeni migrant camp on the Greece-Macedonia border. Hundreds of migrants attempted to break through the border barrier and threw stones at Macedonian police. Police responded by firing tear gas, stun grenades and plastic bullets. More than 200 migrants and at least 15 police officers were injured. A Greek government spokesman called the Macedonian police actions "dangerous and deplorable".
- 12 April: Austria began building a fence and registration center at the Brenner Pass on the Italian border. Austria's Defense Minister threatened to shut the Brenner Pass unless Italy stemmed the northward flow of migrants. The EU and refugee agencies criticized the measures.
- 15 April: There were clashes between a vigilante group and hundreds of migrants at a makeshift migrant camp outside Stalingrad metro station, Paris. Police used tear gas to disperse the crowds, and four people were taken to hospital.
- 16 April: Pope Francis took 12 Syrian refugees back with him to Vatican City after visiting a camp on the Greek island of Lesbos. The three families, including six children, are all Muslim and had their homes bombed during the Syrian civil war. The Vatican stated that Pope Francis wanted to "make a gesture of welcome" to refugees.
- 18 April: The Turkish government threatened to withdraw from its agreement with the EU unless the EU grants visa-free travel for Turkish citizens by June. Withdrawing from the agreement would mean that Turkey would no longer take back migrants from the EU.
- 18 April: Migrants pelted Greek police with stones at Idomeni migrant camp after a migrant was hit by a police van. Police fired tear gas to break up the crowds.
- 19 April: Adverts by the organization 'Refugees Welcome' began being shown to German YouTube users when they search for anti-mass immigration videos. The adverts cannot be skipped and use YouTube's advertising system to target certain search terms.
- 20 April: The Swiss government said it had drawn up plans to deploy 2,000 soldiers at border crossings should there be a major inflow of migrants to the country.
- 24 April: Austrian Freedom Party candidate Norbert Hofer, campaigning against mass immigration, won the first round of voting in the Austrian presidential election. Following the result, pressure mounted on Austrian Chancellor Werner Faymann, of the Social Democratic Party, and he resigned on 9 May. Hofer narrowly lost the final round in December with a record nearly 50% of the vote. Meanwhile, there were further clashes at the Brenner Pass on the Italy–Austria border between 'No Borders' protesters and Austrian police.
- 25 April: Norwegian authorities began offering a 'bonus' 10,000 kroner to 500 asylum seekers willing to leave the country voluntarily. The Norwegian Directorate of Immigration (UDI) said the scheme is less costly than keeping them in asylum centres.
- 26 April: There was rioting at the Moria detention center on the Greek island of Lesbos, shortly after the Greek and Dutch migration ministers toured the center. The migrants set bins on fire and threw stones at police.
- 27 April: The Austrian parliament passed a law allowing the government to declare a state of emergency should there be another surge in immigrant numbers. The authorities would then only let in refugees under threat in a neighboring country or whose relatives are already in Austria. The "special measures" will also require migrants to request asylum at the border in registration centers, where they may be held for up to 120 hours while their application is being checked. Parliament also voted to limit the length of asylum and to make it harder for families to join them.

=== May 2016 ===
- 4 May: The European Commission proposed fining EU member states if they do not take their quota of asylum seekers. Member states would be fined €250,000 for each asylum seeker they do not take in, with the money going to 'frontline' states such as Italy and Greece that have carried the burden.
- 5 May: When Belgian police found dozens of migrants in a lorry at Nieuwpoort, four Iraqi people-smugglers fled in a car, sparking a high-speed chase into France. Police shot at the car, which later crashed near Dunkirk. The chase caused several accidents and a motorcyclist was killed.
- 7 May: There were clashes at the Brenner Pass, on the Italy–Austria border, for the third time in a month. Hundreds of anarchists, protesting against stricter border controls, threw stones and firecrackers at Italian police, who responded with tear gas.
- 9 May: A Syrian migrant was shot and badly wounded by Slovak border guards on the Slovakia-Hungary border. The guards had tried to shoot out the tires of four cars, which tried to illegally cross the border at speed. Six alleged smugglers and 11 migrants were arrested.

=== September 2016 ===
- 14 September: The Egyptian Navy announced they have stopped two fishing boats bound for Europe carrying a total of 440 migrants during the Eid al-Adha holiday in the Kafr El Sheikh Governorate. The boats were later diverted back to Alexandria, were the migrants received medical care by the authorities. The seized fishing boats were later refereed for prosecution.
- 21 September: In the 2016 Egypt migrant shipwreck a boat capsized off the Egyptian coast with around 600 refugees on board in the Mediterranean Sea headed towards Europe. 204 bodies were recovered after the tragedy.

=== November 2016 ===
- 3 November: In the November 2016 Libya migrant shipwrecks around 240 migrants were killed in two capsized boats off the coast of Libya.

=== December 2016 ===
- December: Danish politician from the Danish People's Party Kenneth Kristensen Berth faces some criticism when he suggested shooting at boats carrying migrants.

== Aftermath ==
In 2017 forty per cent of the 706,913 asylum applications to Europe were granted.

=== March 2017 ===
- 17 March: In the wake of tensions between Turkey and several European nations over the 2017 Turkish constitutional referendum, Turkish interior minister Süleyman Soylu threatened to send 15,000 refugees to the European Union every month while foreign minister Mevlut Cavusoglu has also threatened to cancel the March 2016 EU-Turkey migrant deal.

=== June 2017 ===
- 16 June : 906 refugees, including 92 women and 25 children were picked up by the Libyan coast guard seven kilometers from Sabratha, Libya on the Mediterranean Sea, according to a Libyan official.

=== July 2017 ===
- 25 July Rival Libyan governments met in Paris with French President Emmanuel Macron to discuss how to end the Libyan crisis which began in 2011. With the Libyan coast as the departure point on the key Central Mediterranean route to Europe taken by tens of thousands of migrants annually—many of whom drown on the journey—Macron and other European leaders hoped for an agreement that could decrease migrant smuggling.

=== September 2017 ===
- 24 September: The anti-immigration Alternative for Germany (AfD) became the first nationalist party to enter the German Bundestag since World War II, becoming the third largest party overall and single largest opposition party. The rise of the party was directly linked to Angela Merkel's handling of the refugee crisis.

=== December 2017 ===
- 18 December: Formation of the first Kurz government with the anti-immigration Freedom Party of Austria (FPÖ) following the Austrian legislative election in October. The FPÖ as well as Sebastian Kurz campaigned against immigration in an election marked by the migrant crisis.

== 2018 ==
=== January 2018 ===
- 9 January: 2018 Libya migrant shipwrecks up to 100 migrants went missing when a rubberboat was punctured and sank off the Libyan coast.
- 27 January: Czech President Miloš Zeman was re-elected after a campaign against immigration, Muslim migrants and EU refugee quotas. The run-off challenger Jiří Drahoš had stated his more moderate opposition to immigration and refugee quotas.

=== April 2018 ===
- 5 April: Migrant trafficking had become one of the "fastest growing forms of international organised crime" according to Europol, the European Union Agency for Law Enforcement Cooperation who were then tracking as many as 65,000 migrant smugglers.
- 8 April: The right-wing populist Fidesz party led by Hungarian Prime Minister Viktor Orbán won a two-thirds supermajority in parliament, in a victory due almost entirely to a campaign against immigration and EU refugee quotas.

=== June 2018 ===
- 1 June: The populist Government of Change, a coalition between the Five Star Movement and Lega Nord, was formed following the Italian general election in March. Lega leader and Interior Minister Matteo Salvini pledged to stop illegal immigration, deport 600,000 migrants and put an end to Italy and Sicily being "Europe's refugee camp".
- 10 June: Italy and Malta denied entry to the NGO ship Aquarius with 629 people on board (among them seven pregnant women, eleven small children and 123 unaccompanied minors). The migrants had embarked from Libya on inflatable boats, and were picked up off the Libyan coast. Salvini stated he wanted an end to illegal immigration and human trafficking.

=== July 2018 ===
- 8 July: Italy's Interior Minister Matteo Salvini declared that his country would also reject foreign navy as well as Frontex ships that have boarded refugees at sea. He urged Europe's rescue missions to take refugees away from Italy's ports.

=== January 2019 ===
- 5 January: The European Union records the lowest number of migrant arrivals in five years. About 150,000 have taken the Mediterranean route; 57,000 of them were brought to Spanish ports, making the Western Mediterranean the most active migratory route in 2018.

In 2019 the main land and sea border crossings used by migrants included the Central Mediterranean from North Africa (22,900), Eastern Mediterranean (52,000), Western Balkan (5,200), Western Mediterranean (52,400), and the Eastern Land Border (1,000), according to InfoMigrants.

== 2021 ==
For several year there was a steady decrease in human smuggling activities in Europe but in 2021 there was a sharp increase in all of EU's main land and sea entrance points.

== 2022 ==
=== February 2022 ===
- 23 February Europol's European Migrant Smuggling Centre's (EMSC) 2022 annual report confirmed the 2021 Serious and Organised Crime Threat Assessment (SOCTA) that one of the EU's most serious ongoing crime threats is "[m]igrant smuggling and trafficking in human beings (THB)."

=== October 2022 ===
The number of first-time asylum applicants to the EU increased to approximately 996,000. This represented the highest peak since the Syrian war-related 2015 and 2016 exodus.

- 22 October Ninety two migrants, mainly from Afghanistan and Syria, were left without clothing at the border between Greece and Turkey.

== 2023 ==
=== January 2023 ===
- 1 January By 2023, Turkey hosted more Syrians following the Syrian war than all the European countries combined—3.6 million Syrians. Along with Syrian migrants, a million people from Africa, Central Asia, the Middle East and Russia now live in Turkey. After twelve years, Syrian migrants now fear mass deportations.

=== June 2023 ===
- 14 June: The Adriana, a dilapidated and overloaded fishing trawler, capsized and sank in a part of the Mediterranean, the Ionian Sea in what has been described as "one of the worst shipwrecks in recent Mediterranean history". Passengers were from Pakistan, Syria, Palestine, and Egypt. Among the 104 people rescued, there were no women and children. The Hellenic Coast Guard search and rescue operation recovered 92 bodies with 500 considered to be missing and presumed dead.

=== July 2023 ===
- 14 July Frontex, the European Border and Coast Guard, reported that EU border irregular crossing detections had reached the highest total since 2016. The number of detections was 10% higher than in 2022. The report also said that the primary migratory route continued to be the Central Mediterranean. The illegal border crossings migratory routes used by migrant smugglers in order of number of detections reported from January to July 2023 include Central Mediterranean (89,047), Western Balkan (52,232), Exits towards the UK (27,260), Eastern Mediterranean (17, 054), Western African (7,692), Western Mediterranean (6,811), and the Eastern Land Border (2,838).
- 19 July An article in The Economist said that since 2014, about 57,000 irregular migrants have died or disappeared globally according to IOM data but only 33,000 have been found. The IOM believes the actual number of dead and disappeared is higher than that but there is no way of knowing. Most of these migrants have lost their lives by drowning, in their failed attempts to cross the Mediterranean and other seas.
- 16 August Syrians continued to work with human smugglers to escape their war-torn country using the deadly Eastern Mediterranean route, through Libya and then by boat to Europe. The conflict that began with President Bashar al-Assad's repression of peaceful pro-democracy protests in 2013 has resulted in millions of displaced persons and 500,000 of deaths, according to a Agence France-Presse (AFP) news agency story published by Al Jazeera and others.

== See also ==
- Asylum seekers
- List of ships for the rescue of refugees in the Mediterranean Sea
