= 2016 Egypt migrant shipwreck =

Capsizing of a migrant boat in the Mediterranean Sea

Coordinates: 31.523°N 30.355°E

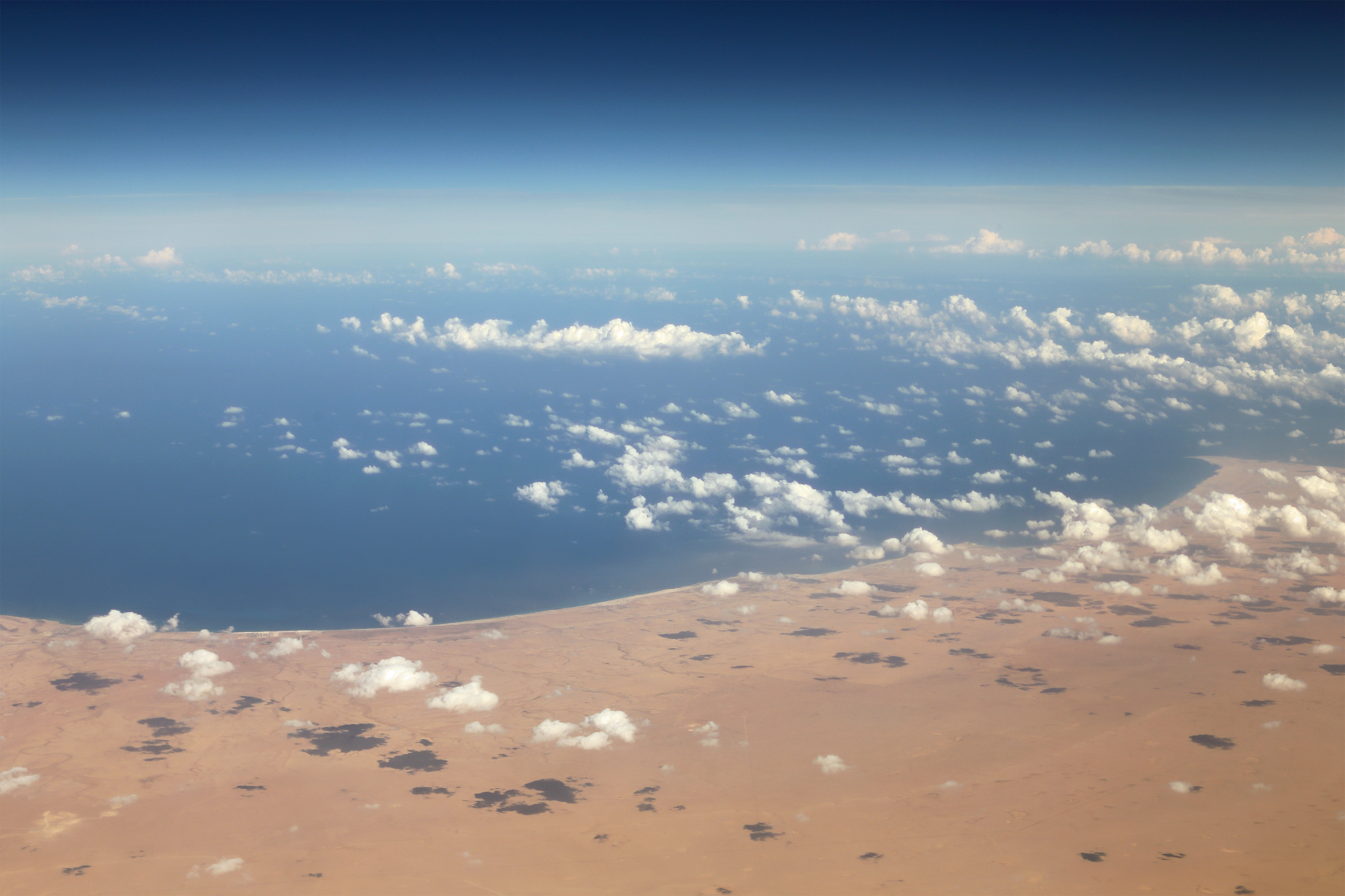
A view over the Egyptian Mediterranean coast.

On September 21, 2016, a boat designed to carry a maximum of 40 people capsized and sank in the Mediterranean Sea approximately 8 km (5.0 mi) from shore near Rosetta, Egypt. The vessel was severely overcrowded and had an estimated 450 refugees aboard at the time of the incident. Survivors reported that migrants had been confined aboard the boat for 5 days as traffickers brought additional groups of migrants to the boat. Traffickers were attempting to load one final group of migrants when the boat capsized and subsequently sank.

Of the approximately 450 people aboard at the time of the sinking, 204 people were confirmed deceased, and 84 remain missing and are presumed dead. Fewer than 40% of the people on board were rescued. Among the 162 survivors, the majority originated from Egypt, however there were also survivors from Syria, Sudan, Eritrea, Ethiopia and Somalia.

Irregular migration across the Mediterranean Sea occurs through three principle pathways: Central, Western, or Eastern sea routes. Those involved in the September 21, 2016 incident sought passage via the Central Mediterranean route. This route departs Northern Africa and targets reaching either Italy or Malta. The International Organization for Migrants (IOM) Missing Migrant Project considers this route to be the "deadliest known migrant route in the world" due to protracted periods at sea and the insufficient search and rescue capabilities in many sectors of the Mediterranean Sea. Since 2014, an estimated 25,678 migrants have been reported missing along the Central Mediterranean Sea route. According to data collected by the Missing Migrants Project, the September 21, 2016 capsizing is one of the worst recorded migrant incidents while attempting to cross the Mediterranean Sea. It has the second highest death toll and is only surpassed by the 2015 Libya migrant shipwreck.

This incident occurred in the broader context of the European migrant crisis, a period marked by a dramatic escalation in the movement of people fleeing conflict, instability, and economic hardship across the Middle East and Africa The crisis peaked in 2015, with substantial flows continuing into 2016. The IOM estimated "that 300,450 migrants and refuges had entered Europe by sea in 2016."

== Geographical and physical impact ==
The accident occurred off the Northern Egyptian coast near Rosetta (Rashid), in the Mediterranean. The port lies within major smuggling points across the Mediterranean Sea to southern Europe. The shipwreck led to increased survey of the coast by the Egyptian authorities. However, growing pieces of evidence show that the Egyptian Coast Guard and Navy were critically slow to respond. The accident caused significant geographical impacts to the environment, people, and policy related impacts on both the local and international scales.

The accident occurred near the Nile Delta, an area characterized by shallow, muddy, and swampy waters, and, sandbanks. The wreck caused water pollution through oil and fuel spillage on the water surface and the coast, together with presence of debris on the river and its banks. This led to disruption on the local maritime ecosystem especially by affecting fish breeding grounds in the coastal waters. In light of the disruption, a fishing ban in the waters was placed to protect the residents from further wreck due to presence of underwater and surface debris, leading to an economic disruption of the fishing community.

The ship carried people from many nationalities. Its capsizing highlighted Egypt's position as a transit and source of migrants from Africa, especially the Middle East, with the destination being Europe. Like many other African migrants, most travel through smugglers to their destination, with many having preferred Egypt to avoid the increasing wars in other countries such as Libya. The government responded by passing the law number 82 (named the "Human anti-smuggling law"), which stipulates substantial fines and imprisonment for smugglers and their accomplices. After the accident and the new bill of law, the migration routes have been switched toward Libya, causing the states of Malta and Italy to increase vigilance on their coastal waters.

Egypt, having passed the anti-smuggling law, started expressing the need for international cooperation with the European Union and the International Organization for migration, to host more refugees and passed a domestic asylum law, which provides a pathway to full integration into citizenship. The intent to corporate opened a pathway to financial aid from Europe and a mutual partnership in managing Europe's migrant crisis. Having the asylum law tied to financial aid, may potentially lead to undermining the refugee's human rights in the long run.

The shipwreck caused a massive disruption in the normal topography in Rosetta. Over 300 people died, there was loss of financial livelihoods, and a significant pollution to the fishing grounds. The government was able to benefit by showcasing their urge to lead in the refugee crisis crackdown, proving to be financially fruitful. A new smuggling pathway through Libya was established after law 82 was passed, which needs more vigilance to protect the lives of the refugees.

== Local and international responses ==
In September 2016, after reports that a migrant vessel carrying hundreds had sunk off the coast of Rashid in northern Egypt, the Egyptian government initially claimed that it had responded promptly. Survivor accounts later indicated that the rescue operation was substantially delayed. Some survivors stated that individuals remained in the water for up to eight hours before any authorities arrived, despite SOS calls reportedly made earlier in the day. Before state authorities arrived on the scene, local fishermen carried out much of the initial rescue, bringing survivors to shore and assisting with body recovery. Their participation showed problems in the national search-and-rescue system. There are issues with coordination, equipment, and quick response times.

In the months following the shipwreck, the Egyptian government placed greater emphasis on its broader policy agenda to address irregular migration. Authorities have emphasized efforts under national plans to fight smuggling along the Mediterranean coast and stop dangerous sea crossings. One of the key policy measures was adopted in November 2016, when the Egyptian Parliament passed Law No. 82 of 2016 on combating illegal migration and migrant smuggling. The legislation added sanctions against criminals involved in smuggling, new inter-agency cooperation structures, and instituted efforts to protect victims of smuggling. Although this legal move has been described as a decisive government action, several analysts have questioned its effectiveness in addressing the issue. International organizations also issued public statements in response to the incident and called for stronger protection mechanisms for migrants in Egypt.

The International Organization for Migration (IOM) was highly concerned about the loss of life, and it declared that it was available to assist the Egyptian authorities in the emergency response stage. IOM has emphasized its current programs aimed at addressing the root causes of irregular migration, including youth unemployment and livelihood challenges in the coastal governorates. The United Nations High Commissioner for Refugees (UNHCR) issued a briefing note acknowledging the tragedy and clarifying that the agency does not possess a law-enforcement mandate. The note emphasized that UNHCR has no institutional role in investigating or reporting maritime disasters or transnational smuggling networks. UNHCR also published survivor testimonies that described overcrowding on the vessel, problems with lifejackets, and the instability that preceded the capsizing. The Guardian and other international media outlets provided extensive coverage of the shipwreck, reporting on its broader implications for Egypt's migration policy.

== Short-term consequences ==
Following the immediate response, the short-term consequences of the disaster became apparent across humanitarian, social, and economic dimensions. Over 160 bodies were recovered within days, underscoring the scale of the tragedy. Hospitals and morgues reached capacity, while families across Egypt and neighboring countries awaited news of missing relatives. The nationality mix of victims, primarily Egyptians, Sudanese, Eritreans, and Somalis further amplified regional concern and public outrage.

Within a week of the disaster, Egyptian authorities intensified coastal patrols and arrested several individuals accused of organizing the voyage. Humanitarian observers reported that rescue operations were delayed, and local fishermen played a crucial role in saving lives during the first hours after the incident.

The shipwreck triggered public debate about accountability and safety measures, highlighting Egypt's role as both a source and transit point for irregular migration to Europe. The shipwreck prompted the Egyptian government to review maritime safety procedures and accelerate the implementation of stricter anti-smuggling legislation law, which imposed substantial fines and prison sentences for human smugglers.

== Long-term consequences ==
Mental health concerns represent a large proportion of the long-term health consequences faced by survivors of the shipwreck. Studies have shown that even years after a maritime disaster, there is a high likelihood of psychological symptoms, such as posttraumatic stress disorder (PTSD), depression, and anxiety. Reports from survivors, including recollections of several hours of waiting to be rescued and the loss of loved ones and family, depict the traumatic nature of the event Beyond the survivors themselves, mental health concerns exist for the friends and family of those that did not survive, as bereavement is also a common cause of depression. As migrants on board the ship came from a variety of different countries (see above), the impact on mental health reverberated throughout the region.

Survivors who were returned and remained in Egypt had to then contend with the mental health infrastructure existent for refugees and migrants in the country. While refugees in Egypt are provided some access to health services similar to Egyptian citizens, further studies have shown a high degree of mental health problems among the Egyptian refugee population – particularly a comorbidity of anxiety, depression, and stress. Scholars call for a multi-sector approach, urging government, community, and healthcare officials to unite and address the mental health needs of refugees.

To this end, in 2022, Egypt launched a free electronic platform that provides mental health services to all those living in Egypt, to include migrants and refugees – the platform offers online counseling and psychoeducational virtual services.

Egypt’s passing of anti-smuggling legislation following the shipwreck served to shift primary departures for maritime migration routes to other North African countries, such as Libya, Tunisia, and Algeria – however, boats departing from Egypt have not entirely ceased. The largest health impact of the continued prevalence of irregular migration routes is the high number of fatalities. The IOM Missing Migrants project (see above) provides a breakdown of the types of deaths caused by transiting this route. While the largest portion of deaths were drowning, the project also reported cases of death due to lack of access to healthcare, harsh environmental conditions, and violence along the route.

The shipwreck itself - and incidents of its kind – contribute to another growing crisis in the realm of planetary health. The water pollution from oil leaks in sunken vessels can lead to toxic and carcinogenic chemicals infiltrating local food and water supplies, representing a direct health risk for nearby populations. The damage caused by these oil leaks on the local environment and marine life subsequently affects local food security and livelihoods.

These long-term consequences are interlinked with one another and represent the detrimental initial and subsequent effects of the shipwreck.

== See also ==
- European migrant crisis
- Timeline of the 2015 European migrant crisis
- Ghost boat investigation
