= Mare Nostrum (disambiguation) =

Mare Nostrum is a Roman term for the Mediterranean Sea.

Mare Nostrum may also refer to:

== Film and TV ==
- Mare Nostrum (1926 film), an American silent film
- Mare Nostrum (1948 film), an Italian-Spanish film
- Mare Nostrum (2016 film), a French-Syrian-Jordanian film

== Music ==
- Ensemble Mare Nostrum, Andrea de Carlo, classical music ensemble on the Arcana Records label recording Alessandro Stradella
- Mare Nostrum, jazz trio that includes Swedish pianist Jan Lundgren, or the self-title albums by the group
- Mare Nostrum, album by Hecq
- Mare Nostrum (album), a 2008 album by Stormlord

== Other ==
- MareNostrum, a supercomputer
- Mare Nostrum (board game)
- Mare Nostrum (swimming), a swimming competition
- Mare Nostrum (video game)
- Operation Mare Nostrum, an Italian naval operation
- Mare Nostrum (novel), a 1918 Spanish-language spy novel by Vicente Blasco Ibáñez, filmed as Torrent 1926

== See also ==
- Mare nostro (disambiguation)
