= European Union response to the 2015 migrant crisis =

The European Union response to the 2015 migrant crisis focused on how the countries organized the efforts in response to the 2015 European migrant crisis at the EU level. The European Commission in May 2015 proposed distributing the incoming refugees based on GDP and population. This proposal was divisive with Slovakia, Hungary, Romania and the Czech Republic refusing any refugees. Some nation states then called on the EU to reduce funding for member countries who did not want to share burdens and didn't share "values...need to start asking themselves questions about their place in the European Union". This attempt to coalition build failed, the European Commission proceeded to strengthen existing systems such as the Common European Asylum System (CEAS), reforming the Dublin Regulation and centralizing the asylum process. There was also challenges to the European borders which came from the Mediterranean Sea; as a response the European Border and Coast Guard Agency engaged in a new operation called Operation Triton.

Politically there was a debate on limiting refugee admittance and a general debate regarding the integrity of borders and illegal actions. Migration policies were also reformed and discussed at the EU level such as the Valletta Summit on Migration which resulted in the Emergency Trust Fund at the European Level.

== Political positions ==
Europe needs to fulfil its humanitarian duty, helping those fleeing for their lives, and as a Christian Democrat, I want to reiterate that is not Christian rights, but human rights that Europe invented. But we also need to better secure our external borders and make sure that asylum rules are used properly and not abused.

— Manfred Weber, leader of the European People's Party in the European Parliament.

Throughout the crisis the opinion of the member states was highly divided. German Chancellor Angela Merkel considered that the lack of cooperation jeopardized the core EU principle of the freedom of movement principle and the Schengen Area. This sentiment was echoed by Italian prime minister Matteo Renzi. A willingness to welcome immigrants was also echoed by Theresa May. French prime minister Manuel Valls also pointed to need for cooperation between the European Commission, member states and candidate states.

However, despite the statements of cooperation the differing approaches of members states was made apparent when former French president Nicolas Sarkozy criticized the EU Migrant plan as well as the welcoming of migrants policy, indicating a fear that migrants would end up in France due to the freedom of movement and the strong welfare. His solutions involved a reformation of the Schengen area. This differed from German policy which was very welcoming towards immigrants.

At the European Parliament level Sergei Stanishev president of the Party of European Socialists indicated the need for a European mechanism for the distribution of migrants.

== Attempted reforms ==
There was various proposals presented by the commission. The May and September 2015 proposals suggested a redistribution quota. In April 2015 they drew up 10-point plan which was drawn up in response to a deadly shipwreck on April 19. In June 2016 it also drew up a reformed plan for the Dublin Regulation.

=== Distribution of asylum seekers among EU member states ===
In May 2015, the European Commission presented the European Agenda on Migration. In it they proposed distributing refugees from Syria, Eritrea and Iraq across EU states based on their GDP and population., with the possibility to opt out of hosting and instead contribute money for resettlement. This plan was contentious and in the end was not implemented as decisions by the European Commission generally require unanimity.

In September 2015 the Commission proposed a new plan redistributing 120,000 refugees. The plan proved extremely divisive. There was a marked difference in the response of Eastern European and Western European member states. Eastern countries such as Slovakia, Hungary, Romania and the Czech Republic declared their intention to defy the decision and refused to accept any refugees at all. Viktor Orbán began claiming that the EU was planning to flood Hungary with immigrants. The Czech echoed this negative sentiment when the Secretary for European Affairs Tomáš Prouza commented that relocated people would eventually leave regardless. Western European politicians, particularly from countries with historically high refugee intakes, criticized what they saw as these member states' intransigence. Berlin called for the EU to reduce funding for member countries that blocked burden-sharing initiatives. French President Hollande declared, "those who don't share our values, those who don't even want to respect those principles, need to start asking themselves questions about their place in the European Union."

In September 2017, the European Court of Justice dismissed legal actions brought by Slovakia and Hungary against the redistribution system. Nevertheless, the Commission, in the face of continuing opposition abandoned the idea in 2020, although several thousand refugees did ultimately end up being resettled to willing countries.

=== Reform of the Dublin regulation ===
The Dublin Regulation was criticised for placing too much responsibility for asylum seekers on member states on the EU's external borders (especially Italy, Greece, Croatia and Hungary), instead of sharing responsibility among EU states. In June 2016, the European Commission proposed reforms to the Dublin Regulation.

=== Centralized processing of asylum applications ===
In April 2015 the European Commission presented 10-point plan which called for the European Asylum Support Office to deploy teams in Italy and Greece to process asylum applications. This was proposed with the aim to eliminate the need for dangerous Mediterranean Sea crossings. On 12 December 2015, it was reported that Frontex had been maintaining combined asylum seeker and deportation hotspots in Lesbos, Greece, since October.

== Rescue operations in the Mediterranean Sea ==
=== Government operations ===
In 2014, Italy had ended Operation Mare Nostrum, a large-scale naval search-and-rescue operation to save stranded migrants in the Mediterranean, saying the costs were too large for one country alone to manage. The Italian government had requested additional funds from the EU to continue the operation but did not receive sufficient support. The UK government cited fears that the operation was "an unintended 'pull factor', encouraging more migrants to attempt the dangerous sea crossing and contributing to drownings. The European Border and Coast Guard Agency took over search and rescue operations throughout the Mediterranean under the name Operation Triton, although its budget, equipment and mandate were far more limited than Mare Nostrum. On 18 May 2015, the European Union launched a new operation based in Rome, named EU Navfor Med, under the command of the Italian Admiral Enrico Credendino, to identify, capture and dispose of vessels used by migrant smugglers. By April 2016, the operation rescued more than 13,000 migrants at sea and arrested 68 suspected smugglers.

=== Non-governmental organizations ===
Non-governmental organizations often filled the vacuum when Italian or EU operations were insufficient to rescue migrant boats in the Mediterranean. Some Italian authorities feared that rather than saving lives, the NGO operations encouraged more people to use the dangerous passage facilitated by human traffickers. In July 2017, Italy drew up a code of conduct for NGO rescue vessels delivering migrants to Italian ports. These rules prohibited coordinating with human traffickers via flares or radio and required vessels to permit police presence on board. More controversially, they also forbade entering the territorial waters of Libya and transferring rescued people onto other vessels, which severely limited the number of people NGOs could save. The Human Rights Watch and Amnesty International criticised the code of conduct and some NGOs, including Doctors Without Borders, eventually suspended rescue operations. In the years following its implementation, Mediterranean Sea crossings dropped considerably, although the degree to which this was caused by the NGO code is disputed. A study conducted from 2014 to 2019 concluded that external factors like weather and the political stability of Libya contributed more to the ebbs and flows of migrants crossing the Mediterranean.

In September 2016, Greek volunteers of the "Hellenic Rescue Team" and human rights activist Efi Latsoudi were awarded the Nansen Refugee Award by the UNHCR "for their tireless volunteer work" in helping refugees arrive in Greece during the 2015 refugee crisis.

=== April 19 shipwreck ===
After 700 migrants drowned following a shipwreck in the Mediterranean Sea on April 19, EU leaders called for an emergency meeting of European interior ministers. The prime minister of Malta, Joseph Muscat, called the 19 April shipwreck the "biggest human tragedy in recent years". Aydan Özoğuz, the German minister for immigration, refugees, and integration, said that emergency rescue missions in the Mediterranean should recommence as more migrants were likely to arrive as the weather turned warmer. "It was an illusion to think that cutting off Mare Nostrum would prevent people from attempting this dangerous voyage across the Mediterranean", she said.

A previously scheduled routine meeting of EU foreign ministers the day after the shipwreck was dominated by refugee policy and preventing migrant deaths. The same day, the European Commission published a ten-point plan to address deaths in the Mediterranean Sea, which doubled the size and budget of Operation Triton and called for capturing or destroying smuggler boats. On April 23, EU leaders held an emergency summit, where they agreed to triple the budget of Operation Triton to €120 million for the year. Ireland and the United Kingdom both committed patrol boats and helicopters to the rescue effort. Amnesty International criticised the EU's response as "a face-saving not a life-saving operation" and said that "failure to extend Triton's operational area will fatally undermine today's commitment". The EU sought to increase the scope of EU Navfor Med include patrols inside Libyan waters in order to capture and dispose of vessels used by smugglers there. Land operations on Libya to destroy vessels used by smugglers had been proposed, but such an operation would have needed UN or Libyan permission.

== Limiting refugee admittance ==
Around November 2015, some European countries restricted family reunions for refugees, and started campaigns to dissuade people worldwide to migrate to Europe. EU leaders also quietly encouraged Balkan governments to only allow nationals from the most war-torn countries (Syria, Afghanistan and Iraq) to pass into the EU.

Throughout the crisis, many countries experienced public debates on whether to limit the number of asylum applications they would accept. Proponents argued that such measures were necessary because no country had the capacity to absorb unlimited numbers of refugees, and that limiting refugee inflows would give countries space to deal with the influx properly. Opponents, most notably German chancellor Angela Merkel, argued that limiting the numbers of refugees would undermine the principle of asylum, contravene national or international laws and be physically unworkable. Others noted that the numbers of people arriving was small relative to most EU countries' populations. Some drew parallels to previous refugee waves, such as during World War II when many countries set limits to refugee admissions from Europe, abandoning many victims of Nazism.

Nevertheless, several countries began setting upper limits to the number of asylum applications it would process per year. In January 2016, Austria announced a limit of 37,500 in each of the next four years later temporarily reduced to 80 per day. In 2018, Germany set a "goal" of not exceeding a net intake of 220,000 annually. Germany also suspended family reunifications for beneficiaries of "subsidiary protection" from 2016 to 2018. Sweden did so for all refugees from 2016 to 2019.

In 2015 and following years, many governments also began formally designating certain countries "safe" in order to make it easier to deny asylum applications from and deport people from them. "Safe country lists" usually included the Balkan countries (Kosovo, Albania, North Macedonia, Montenegro, and Serbia), Georgia, Morocco and Tunisia. Some also controversially listed certain parts of war-torn countries like Iraq or Afghanistan.

== Improving EU's external borders' control ==
A report by EU inspectors in November 2015 found that Greece failed to identify and register arrivals properly. In February 2016, the EU gave Greece a three-month deadline to fix its border controls, or other member states would be authorized to extend border controls to Greece for up to two years instead of the standard six months.

In July 2016, the European parliament and Commission approved a proposal to permanently increase the funding and scope of Frontex, which until then only coordinated the coast guards and border patrols of individual EU countries, and turn it into a true EU-wide border agency and coast guard. Such a step had long been controversial because of sovereignty concerns, as it allows Frontex intervention in border countries even if they did not request it.

== Deterring migrant 'smugglers' ==
February 2016, NATO announced that it would deploy ships in the Aegean Sea to deter smugglers taking migrants from Turkey to Greece. NATO chief Jens Stoltenberg said the mission would not be about "stopping or pushing back refugee boats", but about intelligence gathering and sharing information with Turkey and Greece, which are both NATO members.

== Border fences ==
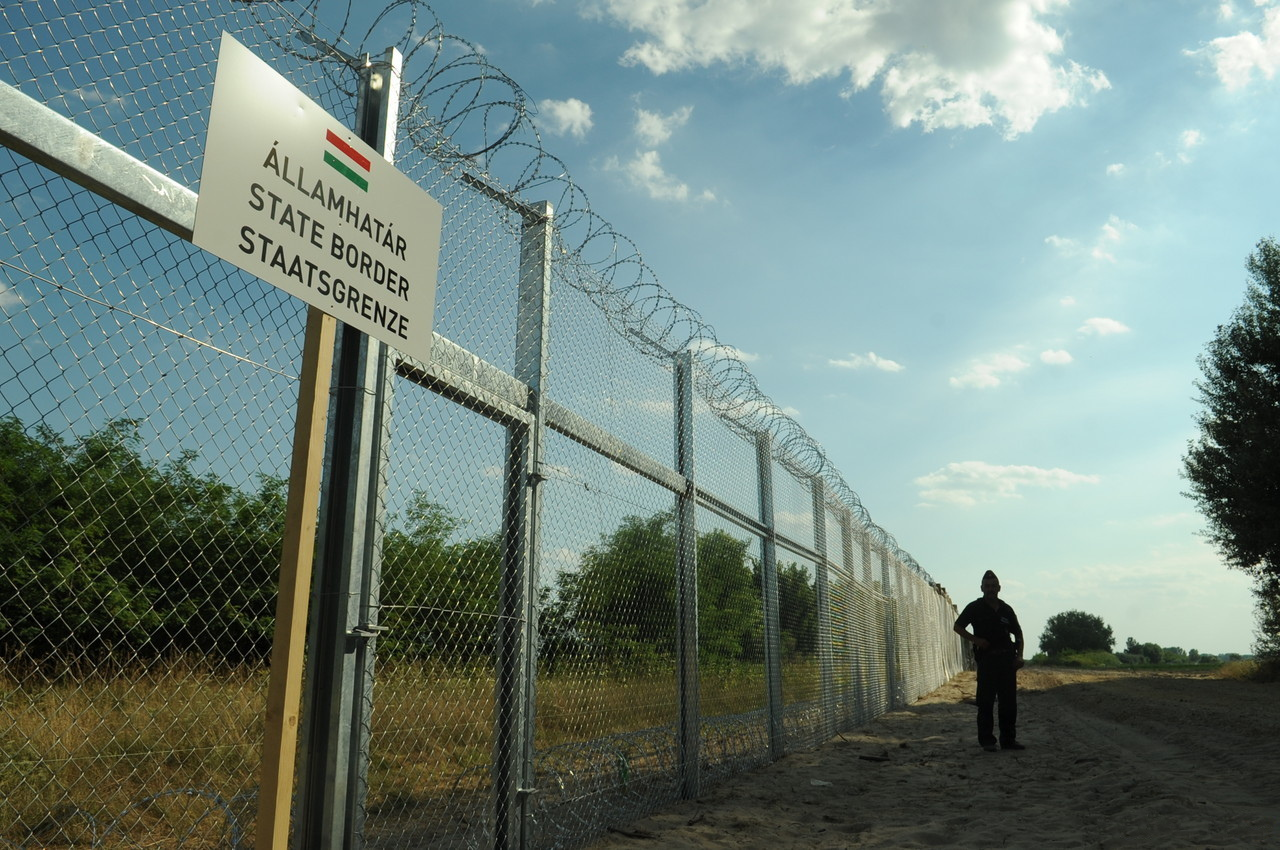
Hungarian border barrier

In late December 2015, Slovenia erected a razor-wire fence along the Istria and Gorski Kotar sections of its border with Croatia, to block migrants and refugees heading for more northern parts of Europe. The WWF and locals warned that the fence would threaten endangered species that roam across the area, such as lynx and brown bears, which are protected by law in Croatia.

On 9 March 2016, the Hungarian government declared a state of emergency for the entire country and deployed 1500 soldiers to its borders. Some observers considered the supposed risk of increased immigration a pretext for centralising executive power, since migrant numbers had already receded significantly by this point. In August 2017 the state of emergency was extended to March 2018.

In total, ten permanent or semi-permanent border barriers were constructed as a direct response to the refugee crisis:

Built by	Border to	Announced	Completed	Length	Main article
Bulgaria	Turkey	Jan 2014	May 2017 (planned)	Full (269 km)	Bulgaria–Turkey border
Hungary	Serbia	June 2015	Apr 2017	Full (175 km)	Hungarian border barrier
Hungary	Croatia	Sep 2015	Oct 2015	Full (150 km)	Hungarian border barrier
Austria	Slovenia	Oct 2015	Jan 2016	Partial (3.7 km)	Austrian border barrier
North Macedonia	Greece	Nov 2015	Dec 2015	Partial (37 km)	North Macedonia border barrier
Latvia	Russia	Dec 2015	2020 (planned)	Partial (93 km)	—

== Migration policies ==
=== Development aid ===
The Valletta Summit on Migration between European and African leaders, on 11 and 12 November 2015, resulted in the EU creating an Emergency Trust Fund to create jobs in African countries, admit more Africans to Erasmus Plus study programmes, and set up regional development programmes in Africa, in return for African countries to counteract migrant smuggling and migrant trafficking and readmit migrants not receiving asylum in Europe.

For example, Germany in 2016 announced new development aid for and security partnerships with Niger, which serves as a transit country for many migrants and refugees from sub-Saharan Africa, and Ethiopia, which hosts 750,000 refugees from other countries.

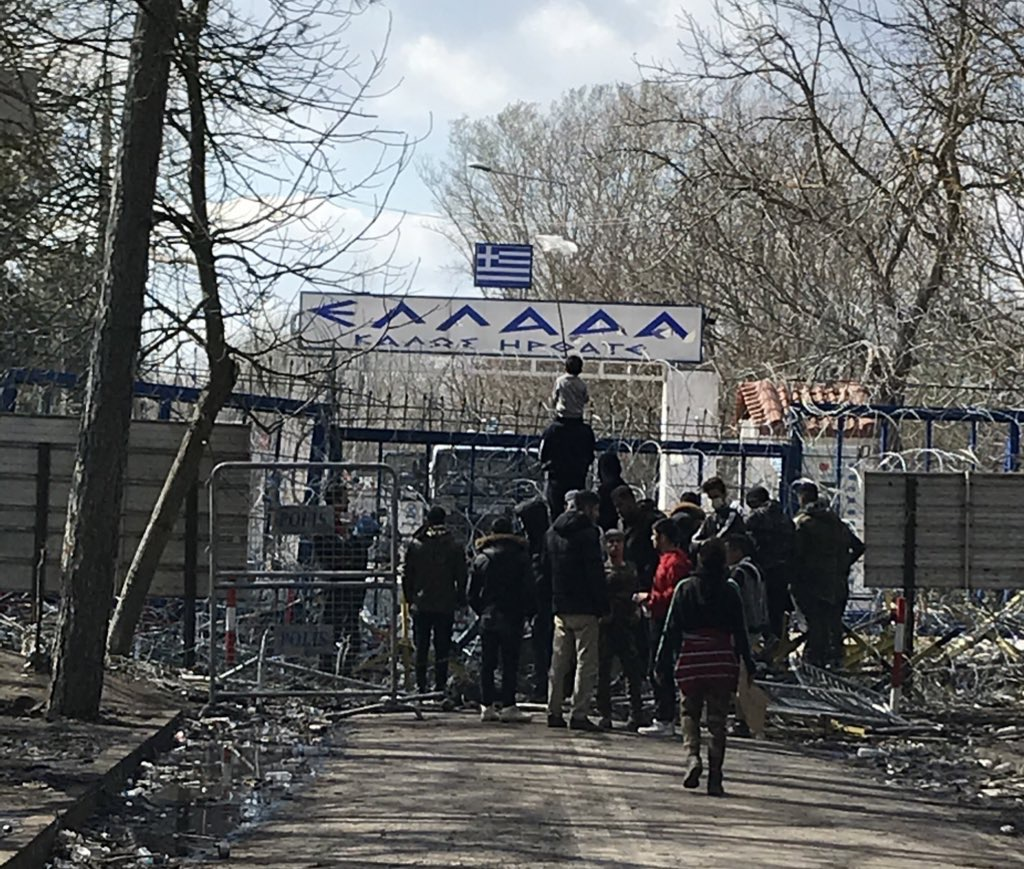
Refugees protesting at the Pazarkule border gate, the Greek-Turkish border

=== Management of immigration ===
Expenditure on refugees (caseload) 2015–2016 (2016 summary)
Country	Refugees (Case)	Costs in € Mil.	Share (GDP)	ø Costs in € per citizen/year
Sweden	179,017	2,403	0.54%	245.27
Austria	136,208	1,566	0.46%	181.91
Germany	1,301,068	13,309	0.44%	163.48
Switzerland	65,164	1,156	0.19%	139.45
Norway	33,613	645	0.18%	124.19
Luxembourg	4,263	69	0.13%	120.82
Finland	37,739	447	0.21%	81.53
Denmark	27,970	393	0.15%	69.31
Malta	3,398	24	0.28%	56.36
Belgium	52,700	543	0.13%	48.08
Netherlands	58,517	680	0.10%	40.15
Italy	197,739	2,359	0.14%	38.80
Cyprus	4,550	36	0.21%	30.79
Hungary	114,365	293	0.27%	29.80
Iceland	850	10	0.06%	29.02
Greece	57,521	313	0.18%	28.91
France	149,332	1,490	0.07%	22.30
UK	81,751	1,081	0.04%	16.59
Bulgaria	36,194	95	0.22%	13.23
EU+EFTA	2,614,306	27,296	0.17%	52.14

The table above summarizes the 1.7 million asylum applicants in 2015 cost €18 billion in maintenance costs in 2016, with the total 2015 and 2016 asylum caseload costing €27.3 billion (27.296 in € Mil.) in 2016. Sweden is observed to bear the heaviest cost.

National governments' position in the European Union Justice and Home Affairs Council majority vote to relocate 120,000 refugees: Yes Opt-out Abstention No Non-EU state

On 15 December 2015 the EU proposed taking over the border and coastal security operations at major migrant entry pressure points via its Frontex operation.

== Crime ==
=== Crime by immigrants ===
In the time during and immediately after the refugee crisis, crimes committed by immigrants were often widely publicised and seized upon by opponents of immigration.

During 2015, foreign fighters who had joined the Islamic state travelled with the migration flow back to Europe. In the January 2016-April 2017 period, four asylum seekers were involved in terrorist incidents, but none who had been granted refugee status. Most of the terrorist attacks in Europe in the period were carried out by citizens of European countries. In 2015, Swedish authorities reported 500 cases of suspected terrorism links or war criminals to the Swedish Security Service. Twenty individuals were denied asylum in Sweden in 2015 due to suspected involvement in war crimes.

On November 13, 2015, a group of men consisting of both EU citizens and non-citizens detonated suicide bombs at a football stadium, fired on crowded cafes and took hostage a concert hall of 1500 people. 130 people died in the attacks. Although very few of the perpetrators came to Europe as asylum seekers, the event sparked a public debate on asylum policy and the need for counterterrorism measures. German Vice-Chancellor Sigmar Gabriel defended Germany's and the EU's refugee policy and pointed out that most migrants are fleeing terrorism.

In 2016, 18 of 31 men suspected of violent assaults on women in Cologne on New Year's Eve were identified as asylum seekers, prompting calls by German officials to deport convicted criminals who may be seeking asylum; these sexual attacks brought about a new wave of anti-immigrant protests across Europe.

On January 11, 2016, there were reports that multiple sexual harassment incidents occurred at the We Are Sthlm festival over the course of several years.

In 2016, the Italian daily newspaper La Stampa reported that officials from Europol conducted an investigation into the trafficking of fake documents for ISIL. They identified fake Syrian passports in the refugee camps in Greece meant for supposed members of ISIL to avoid Greek security and make their way to other parts of Europe. The chief of Europol also said that a new task force of 200 counter-terrorism officers would be deployed to the Greek islands alongside Greek border guards in order to help Greece stop a "strategic" level campaign by ISIL to infiltrate terrorists into Europe.

In October 2016, Danish immigration minister Inger Støjberg reported 50 cases of suspected radicalised asylum seekers at asylum centres. These reports ranged from adult Islamic State sympathisers celebrating terror attacks to violent children dressing up as IS fighters to decapitate teddy bears. Støjberg expressed her frustration at asylum seekers ostensibly fleeing war yet simultaneously supporting violence. Asylum centres that detected radicalisation routinely reported their findings to police. The 50 incidents were reported between 17 November 2015 and 14 September 2016.

In February 2017, British newspaper The Guardian reported that ISIL was paying smugglers fees of up to $2,000 USD to recruit people from refugee camps in Jordan in a desperate attempt to radicalize children for the group. The reports by counter-extremism think tank Quilliam indicated that an estimated 88,300 unaccompanied children—who are reported as missing—were at risk of radicalization by ISIL.

Despite a few prominent events, research focusing on the security impact of the European migration crisis found little evidence that, on average, increasing migration flows corresponded to acts of terrorism. Statistical analysis by Jeffrey Treistman and Charles Gomez found that the "increase in migration did not correspond to an increase in the number of terrorist incidents in Europe."

=== Crime against immigrants ===
In November 2016, the Euro-Mediterranean Human Rights Monitor issued a report in regards to the humanitarian situation of migrants into Greece. It hosted 16,209 migrants on its island and 33,650 migrants on the mainland, most of whom were women and children. Because of the lack of water, medical care and security protection witnessed by the Euro- Med monitor team- especially with the arrival of winter, they were at risk of serious health deterioration. 1,500 refugees were moved into other places since their camps were deluged with snow, but relocation of the refugees always came too late after they lived without electricity and heating devices for too long. It showed that there was a lack of access to legal services and protection for the refugees and migrants in the camps; there was no trust between the residents and the protection offices. In addition, migrants were subject to regular xenophobic attacks, fascist violence, forced strip searches at the hands of residents and police, and detention. Women living in the Athens settlements and the Vasilika, Softex and Diavata camps felt worried about their children as they may be subjected to sexual abuse, trafficking and drug use. As a result, some of the refugees and migrants committed suicide, burned property and protested. The report clarified the difficulties the refugees face when entering into Greece; more than 16,000 people were trapped while awaiting deportation on the Greek islands of Lesbos, Chios, Samos, Leros and Kos, which is twice the capacity of the five islands.

In November 2016, German security officials cracked down on a militant salafist organisation calling itself Die Wahre Religion, which had been targeting newly arrived refugees.

Years later, reports of Croatian police sexually abusing and torturing refugees passing through the country, widely reported by victims but denied by the government, were documented by video. European Commission officials were also later implicated in covering up the abuse.

=== Support systems by local communities and NGOs ===
There are a number of support systems that aid the integration of refugees and asylum seekers in their host country. United Nations High Commissioner for Refugees, working with partners, is providing a broad range of support and assistance in Europe for refugees and asylum-seekers. These efforts include humanitarian and cash assistance, provision of accommodation and support to improve reception conditions, prevention and response to sexual and gender-based violence, protection monitoring and interventions, engaging with refugee communities to enhance their participation and including their voice in their voice in the response, identification and support to persons with specific needs, including separated and unaccompanied children, and referral to appropriate services. The Voice of Young Refugees in Europe provide a support and educational network for young refugees. Many refugees arrive in Europe with a great diversity of skills, experience and specialisations that could make tangible contributions to the EU workforce. In the UK, the Refugee Council organisation provides support and advice to refugees and asylum seekers. The Building Bridges Partnership in the UK was set up to support refugee health professionals re-qualify in the UK. Other organisations include Transitions, a social enterprise that provides advice and helps refugees find placements depending on their qualifications and skills.

There were also various humanitarian and non-governmental organisations, mostly from Slovenia, Croatia and Austria, aiding the migrants on the border.

== Aftermath ==
=== Common European Asylum System (CEAS) ===
In 2016 the European Commission began reforming the Common European Asylum System (CEAS) which was initially designed to create a unified asylum system for the EU. In an attempt to create measures for safe and managed paths for legal migration to Europe, the European Commission created five components that sought to satisfy the minimum standards for asylum.

On 13 July 2016, the European Commission introduced the proposals to finalise the CEAS' reform. The reform sought to create a just policy for asylum seekers while providing a new system that was simple and shortened. Ultimately, the reform proposal attempted to create a system that could handle normal and impacted times of migratory pressure.

=== Tightening of asylum laws ===
In 2016 Sweden began issuing three-year residence permits to recognized refugees. Refugees had previously received permanent residency automatically. In January 2016, Denmark passed a law permitting police to confiscate valuables like jewelry and cash from refugees. As of early 2019, the police had only enforced the cash-seizing provision.

=== Integration of refugees ===
While figures specifically for refugees are often not available, they tend to be disproportionately unemployed compared to the local population, especially in the years immediately following their resettlement. OECD data comparing employment rates of local-born compared to foreign-born residents demonstrated large differences between countries. According to a 2016 article, it took foreign-born an average of 20 years to fully "catch up" with locals. In all countries (except Italy and Portugal) immigrants had lower rates of employment compared to the local population, but considerable differences exist with respect to both host countries and countries of origin. In the Netherlands, Denmark, Sweden and Germany, for instance, the gap was larger than in the UK, Italy and Portugal.

=== Rejected asylum seekers ===
The number of return has returned to what it was at around one-third. In some countries that took in large numbers of asylum seekers, this has resulted in people not having legal residency rights, raising worries of institutionalised poverty and the creation of parallel societies. There has been a tension created between the EU and nation states. Following the 2015 refugee crisis some member states enacted legislation to speed up deportations. however the EU began threatening to withhold development aid from or impose visa restrictions on countries refusing to take in their own citizens.

For a variety of reasons, some rejected asylum seekers also ended up being permitted to stay. Some countries, such as Germany and Sweden, allow rejected asylum seekers to apply for certain other visas (e.g., to pursue vocational training if they have secured an apprenticeship).

== See also ==
- New Pact on Migration and Asylum
- Migration and asylum policy of the European Union
