= Yumna Marwan =

Lebanese actress

- Born: Beirut, Lebanon
- Education: Smith College
- Occupation: Actress
- Years active: 2013–present
- Television: Little Birds; The Veil

Yumna Marwan (Arabic: يمنى مروان) is a Lebanese television and film actress.

== Early life and education ==
Born in Lebanon, Yumna Marwan grew up in Beirut before moving to Iowa in the United States as a teenager.

She graduated with a degree in anthropology from Smith College in Northampton, Massachusetts in 2013.

== Career ==
Marwan made her screen debut in 2013, when she starred in her first feature film The Valley by Lebanese writer and director Ghassan Salhab. In 2016, she was the lead actress in the Mounia Akl short film Submarine which won the Muhr Jury Prize at the Dubai International Film Festival.

In 2020 she appeared in Tangiers-set television series Little Birds alongside Juno Temple, playing the part of dominatrix Cherifa Lamor, in her first English-language screen role. That year, she was in the film Translator, directed by Rana Kazkaz and Anas Khalaf. In 2021, she starred in Mounia Akl’s debut feature film Costa Brava, Lebanon.

That year, she again worked with Ghassan Salhab on his 2021 film The River. She also appeared in the Shahid original series Hell's Gate, directed by International Emmy Award winner, Amin Dora, set in a futuristic Beirut and considered the first Arab science-fiction series.

In 2023, she played Lauren in Amjad Al-Rasheed’s drama feature film Inshallah a Boy.

In 2024, she had a main role in the Steven Knight espionage thriller television series The Veil, alongside Elisabeth Moss.

== Filmography ==
Year	Title	Role	Notes
2013	The Valley	Maria	
2015	5th Floor Room 52	Lyla	Short film
2015	Sparks	Girl No. 1	Short film
2016	Writing on Snow	Volunteer	
2016	Tombé du ciel	Yasmine	
2016	Submarine	Hala	Short film
2016	Après	Tamima	Short film
2017	The Incident		Short film
2017	One of These Days		
2018	Before We Heal		Short film
2018	Madina, IA		Short film; also director
2019	Sharie Hayfa		
2020	Little Birds	Cherifa Lamor	6 episodes
2020	The Translator	Karma	
2021	The River		
2021	Costa Brava, Lebanon	Alia	
2021	Hell's Gate		
2021	From the Mountain	Turkiya	Short film
2023	Inshallah a Boy	Lauren	
2024	The Strangers' Case	Rima Homsi	
2024	The Veil	Adilah	Main role
