= Operation Themis =

2018-present border patrol operation in Central Mediterranean

Joint Operation Themis is the successor to Operation Triton, and began in 2018. This was after Operation Triton in turn had followed Operation Mare Nostrum in 2014. All of these operations have been run by the European Border and Coast Guard Agency of the European Union, also known as Frontex.

== Description ==
Themis is an operation in the Central Mediterranean, whereby Frontex monitors the coastal regions of Algeria, Tunisia, Libya, and Egypt for marine traffic with potential to generate "incoming flows" of migrants trying to enter Europe irregularly. The initial intent was that the operation should provide 10 Frontex ships for a year.

At the same time, Frontex has also been running Poseidon Rapid Intervention (in succession to Operation Poseidon), in the Eastern Mediterranean, and Operations Indalo (year-round) and Minerva (summer months) covering the Western Mediterranean, and Hera on the West coast of Africa.

The aims of EU operational patrols in the Mediterranean are to secure EU borders, to target smugglers of migrants, and to rescue migrants at risk.

Following earlier phases when Italy had borne the brunt of economic and social consequences of mounting such operations, Joint Operation Themis is intended to support Italy with border control, surveillance, and search and rescue in the Central Mediterranean.

In the last year of Operation Triton, which ended in February 2018, Frontex rescued 38,000 people in the Mediterranean. According to one source, during this period a larger number of refugees were rescued by a flotilla of NGO ships operating closer to the coast of Libya.

The operation as a whole runs under the command of the Italian Ministry of the Interior.

== Operations against illegal networks ==
During the time that Joint Operation Themis has run, in the Mediterranean region Frontex has also mounted successively Operation Sophia and then, since March 2020, Operation Irini, which are intended more specifically to disrupt human smuggling and trafficking networks.

== See also ==
- Operation Mare Nostrum (2013–2014)
- Operation Triton (2014–2018)
- Operation Sophia (2015–2020)
- Operation Irini (2020 onwards)
