= Mare nostro =

Mare nostro may refer to:

- Mare nostro (opera), 1985
- Mare Nostrum, a Roman term for the Mediterranean Sea and a term in Fascist Italy

== See also ==
- Mare Nostrum (disambiguation)
