= Rana Kazkaz =

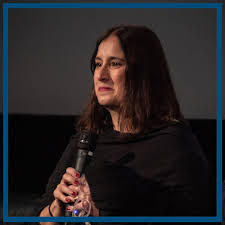
- Born: May 4, 1971 (age 54)
- Occupations: Filmmaker & Professor
- Website: ranakazkaz.com

Rana Kazkaz (born May 4, 1971) is a Syrian-American filmmaker and professor. Her films have received numerous international awards and selections, such as at Cannes, Sundance, TIFF, and Tribeca. She is also an associate professor at Northwestern University in Qatar where she teaches narrative filmmaking.

== Early life and education ==
Kazkaz was born in Grenoble, France to a Syrian father and a Polish-American mother. She has lived in France, Syria, the United States, Algeria, Russia, Lebanon, Jordan, and Qatar.

She holds a joint MFA from Carnegie Mellon University and the Moscow Art Theater, and a BA from Oberlin College.

== Career ==
A member of the Académie des César, she has received a certificate from American Film Institute’s Directing Workshop for Women, and has been awarded fellowships with the Buffett Institute for Global Affairs, Ryan Murphy's Half Initiative, and MacDowell.

Her film portfolio highlights Syrian stories, which began in 2007 with Kemo Sabe, a story about an Arab-American boy who wishes to be a Cowboy instead of an Indian on the playground. Her film Deaf Day tells the story of a mother living in Damascus, who wishes to teach her son how to live in a hearing world, but is instead reminded of the value of silence. Mare Nostrum depicts a father on the shores of the Mediterranean Sea who risks his daughter's life to save her. The film won over 35 international awards, and was selected in over 100 festivals worldwide, including Sundance and Dubai International Film Festival. Searching for the Translator (2016) documents an acting workshop where Syrian refugees are provided a safe environment to explore their emotions of fear and courage. Her first feature film, The Translator, is about a man who finds his voice during the Syrian Revolution.

== Filmography ==
Year	Title	Format
2020	The Translator	Feature
2016	Mare Nostrum	Short
2016	Searching for the Translator	Documentary
2011	Deaf Day	Short
2007	Kemo Sabe	Short

== Producer ==
Kazkaz co-founded Synéastes Films in 2010 alongside Anas Khalaf, focusing on creating films that highlight stories from the Middle East. Their internationally co-produced works include Mare Nostrum, Deaf Day, and The Translator. Synéastes Films has garnered support from renowned institutions such as the Cannes Cinéfondation, the European Union, British Council, Arte and more. Currently, they have several feature films in development.
