= The Veil (miniseries) =

American thriller television series

- Genre: Thriller
- Created by: Steven Knight
- Written by: Steven Knight
- Directed by: Daina Reid; Damon Thomas
- Starring: Elisabeth Moss; Yumna Marwan; Dali Benssalah; Josh Charles; Thibault de Montalembert
- Music by: Jon Opstad
- Country of origin: United States
- Original language: English
- No. of episodes: 6

Production
- Executive producers: Steven Knight; Denise Di Novi; Elisabeth Moss; Daina Reid; Lindsey McManus
- Producers: Adrian Kelly; Xavier Roy
- Cinematography: Bonnie Elliott
- Editors: Hunter M. Via; Nikki McChristie
- Running time: 38–67 minutes
- Production companies: Nebula Star; Di Novi Pictures; Love & Squalor Pictures; FXP

Original release
- Network: FX on Hulu
- Release: April 30 – May 28, 2024

The Veil is an American thriller television limited series written by Steven Knight, produced by FX Productions, and starring Elisabeth Moss and Yumna Marwan. The series premiered on FX on Hulu on April 30, 2024.

== Premise ==
A thriller series about a potentially deadly game of truth and lies as two women travel from Istanbul to Paris and London, with one of them possessing a secret that the other needs to expose.

== Cast ==
=== Main ===
- Elisabeth Moss as Imogen Salter, a veteran MI6 agent with a specialty in undercover work
- Yumna Marwan as Adilah El Idrissi, a French woman suspected of being an ISIS leader planning an attack on the West
- Dali Benssalah as Malik Amar, an agent with French intelligence agency DGSE and Salter's boyfriend
- Josh Charles as Max Peterson, an obnoxious CIA agent collaborating with Amar and Salter
- Thibault de Montalembert as Magritte, Amar's superior at DGSE

=== Guest starring ===
- James Purefoy as Sir Michael Althorp, Imogen's mentor
- Dan Wyllie as Guy, Imogen's UNHCR contact
- Joana Ribeiro as Sandrina, another associate of Imogen, also at UNHCR
- Haluk Bilginer as Mr. Demir
- Alec Secăreanu as Emir
- Kobna Holdbrook-Smith as Johnson
- Nadia Larbioune as Nour
- Keyla and Neyla Bara as Yasmina, Nour's niece
- Phill Langhorne
- Aron von Andrian

== Production ==
=== Development ===
The project was announced in August 2022, and marks the fourth series Steven Knight has made with FX Productions. Knight also acts as executive producer. Elisabeth Moss is also executive producer via her Love & Squalor production company for whom Lindsey McManus is also an executive producer. Denise Di Novi and Nina Tassler of PatMa Productions also executive produce.

=== Casting ===
Elisabeth Moss was confirmed in the lead role in August 2022. Moss has stated that developing an authentic British accent and practicing the action and stunt choreography to make her character believable was more challenging than any previous role. She started learning the accent several months before filming began.

In February 2023, Josh Charles, Dali Benssalah, and Yumna Marwan joined the cast. In March 2023, Haluk Bilginer was added to the cast. The cast also includes Alec Secareanu, Thibault de Montalembert, Kobna Holdbrook-Smith, James Purefoy, Joana Ribeiro, Phill Langhorne, Dan Wyllie, Aron von Andrian, and Dali Benssalah.

=== Filming ===
Filming in Turkey started in March 2023. Other filming locations include Paris and London. Filming in Kent, England took place in May 2023, with locations including Canterbury Cathedral. Whilst filming a stunt in Istanbul, Moss fractured a vertebra in her spine.

== Episodes ==
No.	Title	Directed by	Written by	Original release date
1	"The Camp"	Daina Reid	Steven Knight	April 30, 2024
Adilah El Idrissi (Yumna Marwan), first seen at a refugee camp, faces imminent danger due to her alleged ties to ISIS. Imogen Salter (Elisabeth Moss), posing as an NGO worker, forms an unexpected alliance with Adilah, aiming to protect her from a mob seeking revenge. Meanwhile, suspicions arise about Imogen's true motives, leading to tension with her contact, Guy (Dan Wyllie). As Imogen and Adilah embark on a perilous journey, their backgrounds and motivations come to light, revealing a complex web of personal and political intrigue. Adilah's identity is questioned by French intelligence, setting the stage for a high-stakes confrontation.
2	"Crossing the Bridge"	Daina Reid	Steven Knight	April 30, 2024
At the refugee camp on the Syrian–Turkish border, the U.S. military arrives looking for Adilah. In France, Adilah's daughter gets into some trouble with American intelligence agencies. Imogen and Adilah continue their journey to Istanbul, where Imogen abandons their car and subdues an armed pursuer. They seek help from a man (Haluk Bilginer) to obtain fake passports, while Max Peterson (Josh Charles) informs French intelligence of the Americans' moves. The French and American intelligence agencies are closely monitoring Imogen and Adilah's movements, unsure if Adilah is the real target or an ISIS commander using her identity as a cover. Imogen suspects Adilah may be the wanted terrorist Sabaine Al-Qubaisi.
3	"The Asset"	Daina Reid	Steven Knight	May 7, 2024
Imogen and Max are revealed to have a working relationship, collaborating to uncover information about her father's death. Meanwhile, Adilah's part of a larger terrorist plot is brought to light, involving the transport of radioactive material on a ship bound for the Eastern Seaboard of the United States. Imogen and Adilah continue their cat-and-mouse game, with Adilah eventually gaining the upper hand on Imogen. She lets her go in return for Imogen's help in Adilah and her daughter's escape. In the episode, Imogen also meets with Malik Amar (Dali Benssalah), who warns her of being followed and traced by the other intelligence agencies, while being worried about her behavior with her alter egos.
4	"Declassified"	Damon Thomas	Steven Knight	May 14, 2024
Max provided the file on Imogen's father which revealed he was a Russian agent. There are repeated implications that the Russians are behind the potential terrorist attack. Max suffers a setback when an agent is killed by Emir (who is known to Adilah) who manages to give a second agent the slip. A mystery group of operatives stop Imogen and Adilah's taxi which leads to a fight and many bullets with most of the operatives dying with Adilah assisting Imogen's survival. Malik and the DGSE have employed technology to listen to Max's and other's communications and are holding intelligence not being shared with Max.
5	"Grandfather's House"	Damon Thomas	Steven Knight	May 21, 2024
The massed resources of the CIA and DGSE were duped twice in this episode. Adilah swaps clothes with a food delivery biker to leave the apartment and meet with Emir so that he can hand over the detonation key for the dirty bomb on its wway to the USA. Emir requires Imogen's death which Adilah will not undertake personally but will arrange a rendezvous. "Attending" a hacked zoom communication Imogen becomes aware that the CIA plan to abduct Adilah's daughter and use her to gain the required information on the ship. Knowing this Imogen extracts child and guardian using wheelie bins first from under the noses of the surveillance teams and despatches them to England. At the rendezvous Imogen's sixth sense kicks in and she hustles Adilah away at gunpoint leading the killer to stand down. Adilah and Imogen have a huge verbal fight at a service station as they head to England with Imogen promising she will get mother and daughter to Canada.
6	"The Cottage"	Damon Thomas	Steven Knight	May 28, 2024
Having arrived in England, Imogen and Adilah need to lose their followers and inside Canterbury Cathedral Imogen convinces a visitor to drive them to Whitechapel where she makes contact with her former mentor who arranges their collection by Patrick his aide, who transports them to his countryside castle. Max and Malik settle their differences long enough to reach the same estate. Imogen's former mentor, Sir Michael (James Purefoy), (also the father of her baby) is not making good on his promises and may have been in league with her traitorous father. Sir Michael is about to kill Imogen when Malik arrives and terminates him. Elsewhere Adilah apparently neutralises former marine Patrick by stabbing him although he then brings down Max. Adilah waits for Imogen in a Land Rover who emerges to drive them both to safety. Patrick has recovered sufficiently to utilise a high power rifle to kill Adilah who has left a clue to identity of the frigate enabling its interception. Having sent Adilah's daughter to Canada, Imogen becomes aware of a cottage in the grounds of the castle from which her father drives away shortly before her arrival, where he has been living since his death, both her father and mentor seemingly working for Russian intelligence.

== Release ==
The series was shown on Hulu in the United States, premiering on April 30, 2024, with a two episode premiere, Star+ in Latin America and Disney+ under the Star banner internationally. It was shown on Channel 4 in the UK from July 2025.

== Reception ==
=== Viewership ===
JustWatch, a guide to streaming content with access to data from more than 20 million users around the world, estimated that The Veil was the third most-streamed series in the U.S. from April 29 to May 5. The streaming aggregator Reelgood, which tracks 20 million monthly viewing decisions across all streaming platforms in the U.S., calculated that The Veil was the ninth most-streamed show in the U.S. for the week ending May 29.

=== Critical response ===
The review aggregator website Rotten Tomatoes reported a 54% approval rating with an average rating of 5.7/10, based on 35 critic reviews. The website's critics consensus reads, "Elisabeth Moss' dramatic power remains undiminished with another arresting performance, but The Veil's clunky storytelling doesn't live up to its star's chops." Metacritic, which uses a weighted average, assigned a score of 52 out of 100 based on 20 critics, indicating "mixed or average reviews".

Aramide Tinubu of Variety praised the series as 'gripping', commending Moss's performance, the action and the pacing. Robert Lloyd of the Los Angeles Times said 'As a spy story, it’s a decent example of its kind, but as a dramatic two-hander, fueled by subtle performances from Moss and Marwan, it’s pretty terrific.' Alan Sepinwall of Rolling Stone was more mild in his praise, also praising Moss and the action sequences but questioning the balance between spy thriller and psychological drama. Daniel Fienberg of The Hollywood Reporter complimented the opening and Moss, but felt that ' The Veil first becomes perfunctory — Homeland-lite — before fizzling entirely in its concluding episodes, in which almost none of its twisty reveals hits deeply on either a plot or character level.' Benjamin Lee of The Guardian awarded the first episode one star out of five, dubbing it 'a bafflingly bad time-waster' and criticizing the plot and acting. Saloni Gajjar of The A.V. Club was also harsh, dubbing the series 'boring and aimless'.
