= Inshallah a Boy =

- International release poster
- Arabic: إن شاء الله ولد
- Directed by: Amjad Al Rasheed
- Written by: Delphine Agut; Rula Nasser; Amjad Al Rasheed
- Produced by: Yousef Abed Alnabi; Aseel Abu Ayyash; Rula Nasser
- Starring: Mouna Hawa
- Cinematography: Kanamé Onoyama
- Edited by: Ahmed Hafez
- Music by: Andrew Lancaster; Jerry Lane
- Production companies: The Imaginarium; Bayt Al Shawareb; Georges Films
- Distributed by: Greenwich Entertainment; MAD Entertainment; Pyramid Distribution
- Release date: May 18, 2023 (Cannes)
- Running time: 113 minutes
- Countries: Jordan; France; Saudi Arabia; Qatar; Egypt

Inshallah a Boy (Arabic: إن شاء الله ولد, romanized: ʾIn shāʾ Allāh walad) is a 2023 drama film directed by Amjad Al Rasheed. A coproduction of companies from Jordan, France, Saudi Arabia, Qatar and Egypt, the film stars Mouna Hawa as Nawal, a recently widowed woman who must pretend to be pregnant in order to protect herself and her daughter from Jordan's patriarchal inheritance laws, which would permit her husband's family to take everything she owned, leaving Nawal with nothing, solely because she did not bear him a son.

The cast also includes Haitham Alomari, Yumna Marwan, Salwa Nakkara, Mohammed Al Jizawi, Eslam Al-Awadi, Seleena Rababah, Siranoush Sultanian, Serene Huleileh, Mohammad Suleiman, Mona Shehabi, Areej Dababneh, Niveen Haddadeen, Assaf al Rousan, Nahla Al-Moghrabi, Ala Al-Riyahi and Mohammad Wasfi.

== Production ==
Al Rasheed and his writing partners Delphine Agut and Rula Nasser wrote the screenplay based in part on the real-life experiences of a relative of Al Rasheed's.

While the film was in production, it won the Biennale di Venezia Prize award in the Final Cut program for works in progress at the 79th Venice International Film Festival.

== Distribution ==
The film premiered in the Critics Week program at the 2023 Cannes Film Festival. It had its North American premiere at the 2023 Toronto International Film Festival, and its Arab world premiere at the 2023 edition of the Red Sea International Film Festival.

It was acquired for distribution in the United States by Greenwich Entertainment, and announced several further international distribution deals in December, before going into commercial release in January 2024.

== Critical response ==
Aparita Bhandari of Paste wrote that "Palestinian actress Hawa shines as Nawal, and is ably assisted by a supporting cast in her portrayal of a widow sometimes barely grasping at straws. There’s a lived-in weariness that Hawa taps into; her version of Nawal is never distraught, nor enraged—although she has flashes of outbursts. She simply does not have the luxury. The way that Hawa is able to articulate Nawal’s moment of personal crisis, in the furtive look she gives her sister-in-law or the exasperation she reserves for her own brother, makes for a commendable performance."

For Variety, Jessica Kiang wrote that "Al Rasheed’s precision-tooled movie is a social-realist drama rendered as an escape thriller where the labyrinth that Nawal must navigate is the Jordanian social order itself, a massive bureaucratic, patriarchal maze designed to ensure that any woman trying to evade its clutches will batter herself to exhaustion sooner or later against one of its deviously placed dead ends."

== Awards ==
At Cannes, the film won the Gan Foundation Award and the Rail d'Or.

Hawa won the Asia Pacific Screen Award for Best Performance at the 16th Asia Pacific Screen Awards, the award for Best Actress at the Red Sea International Film Festival, and the award for Best Actress at the 2024 Critics Awards for Arab Films.

The film was selected as Jordan's submission for the Academy Award for Best International Feature Film at the 96th Academy Awards, but did not make the list of finalists for the award.
