= Costa Brava, Lebanon =

2021 Lebanese film

- Promotional release poster
- Directed by: Mounia Akl
- Written by: Mounia Akl; Clara Roquet
- Produced by: Myriam Sassine; Georges Schoucair
- Starring: Nadine Labaki; Saleh Bakri; Nadia Charbel; Ceana Restom; Geana Restom; Liliane Chacar Khoury; Yumna Marwan; Francois Nour
- Cinematography: Joe Saade
- Edited by: Carlos Marqués-Marcet; Cyril Aris
- Music by: Nathan Larson
- Production companies: Abbout Productions; Snowglobe Film; Cinéma Defacto; Participant; Barentsfilm; Fox in the Snow; Lastor Media; Swedish Film Institute; Danish Film Institute; CNC
- Distributed by: Avalon (Spain); Folkets Bio (Sweden); Øst for Paradis (Denmark); Kino Lorber (United States)
- Release dates: September 5, 2021 (Venice); November 7, 2021 (Seville)
- Running time: 106 minutes
- Countries: Lebanon; France; Qatar; Spain; Sweden; Denmark; Norway; United States
- Language: Arabic
- Box office: $71,231

Costa Brava, Lebanon (Arabic: كوستا برافا، لبنان, romanized: Kūstā Brāfā, Lubnān) is a 2021 drama film directed by Mounia Akl from a screenplay by Akl and Clara Roquet. It stars Nadine Labaki, Saleh Bakri, Nadia Charbel, Ceana Restom, Geana Restom, Liliane Chacar Khoury, Yumna Marwan and Francois Nour.

The film had its world premiere at the 2021 Venice International Film Festival on September 5, 2021. It was selected as the Lebanese entry for the Best International Feature Film at the 94th Academy Awards. This film was also nominated for the New Talent Award at the Hong Kong Asian Film Festival 2021.

== Plot ==
In the near future, Soraya and Walid have built an idyllic life in the mountains, far from the disorder and pollution of Beirut, the capital of Lebanon. There, they live with one of their parents and their two children — until the installation of a supposedly ecological landfill disrupts their harmony.

== Cast ==
- Nadine Labaki as Soraya
- Saleh Bakri as Walid
- Nadia Charbel as Tala
- Ceana Restom as Rim
- Geana Restom as Rim
- Liliane Chacar Khoury
- Yumna Marwan
- Francois Nour

== Production ==
In July 2021, it was announced Nadine Labaki and Saleh Bakri had joined the cast of the film, with Mounia Akl directing from a screenplay she wrote alongside Clara Roquet.

== Release ==
The film premiered at the 2021 Venice International Film Festival on September 5, 2021. It was also screened at the 2021 Toronto International Film Festival (TIFF) on September 11, 2021. At TIFF, it won the NETPAC Prize. Screened at the 18th Seville European Film Festival (SEFF) on 7 November 2021, the film won the festival's Grand Jury Prize ex aequo with Onoda: 10,000 Nights in the Jungle. In June 2022, Kino Lorber acquired U.S. distribution rights to the film, and set it for a July 15, 2022, release.

== Reception ==
On Rotten Tomatoes, the film holds an approval rating of 90% based on 39 reviews with an average rating of 7.5/10. Metacritic, which uses a weighted average, assigned the film a score of 80 out of 100, based on 14 critics, indicating "generally favorable" reviews.

== See also ==
- List of submissions to the 94th Academy Awards for Best International Feature Film
- List of Lebanese submissions for the Academy Award for Best International Feature Film
