= Vasilika refugee camp =

Refugee camp

The Vasilika refugee camp is a military-run refugee camp located in an old warehouse in Vasilika village (Thermi), Central Macedonia, Greece. The camp opened on 14 June 2016 to host the refugees evicted from the Idomeni refugee camp and Hotel Hara.

Greek authorities declared that 1,158 people, fundamentally Syrian and Iraqi, were moved from the Eko camp (belonging to Idomeni refugee camp) to Vasilika in buses.

As of 23 June 2016, there were 1,205 refugees registered in the Vasilika refugee camp. Some refugees have denounced to the media the poor conditions of the camp regarding food and facilities.
