= Mare Nostrum (2016 film) =

2016 short film by Rana Kazkaz and Anas Khalaf

Mare Nostrum is a 2016 short, coming-of-age film directed by the Syrian-American filmmakers Rana Kazkaz and Anas Khalaf. The 14-minute long film received a number of awards. A wordless film, it deals with the issue of refugees crossing the Mediterranean.

== Premise ==
On the shore of the Mediterranean Sea, a Syrian father takes a decision that puts his daughter's life at risk.

== Honors ==
Grand Prix at the Rencontres du Cinéma Européen – Association Cinécran, France
Dubai International Film Festival, UAE
Sundance Film Festival, USA
Arab Film Festival (ALFILM), Germany
Diploma of Merit at the Tampere Film Festival, Finland
Jury award at the Festival de Cinéma Traversées, France
Clap d’Argent and Prix du Collège de l’image at the Clap 89, France
Special Mention at the Festival Internacional de Cine, Spain
Best International Short Award at the Human Rights Arts and Film Festival, Australia
Youth Award at the Festival International du Film Arabe de Murcia, Spain
Best Short NYU Florence Award at the Middle East Now Film Festival, Italy
Best Foreign Film award at the Windy City Film Festival, USA
Special Jury Mention at the Festival du film en plein air de Grenoble, France
Honorary Mention by the Jury at the Franco-Arab Film Festival, Jordan
