= Operation Triton =

2014–2018 EU border patrol operation

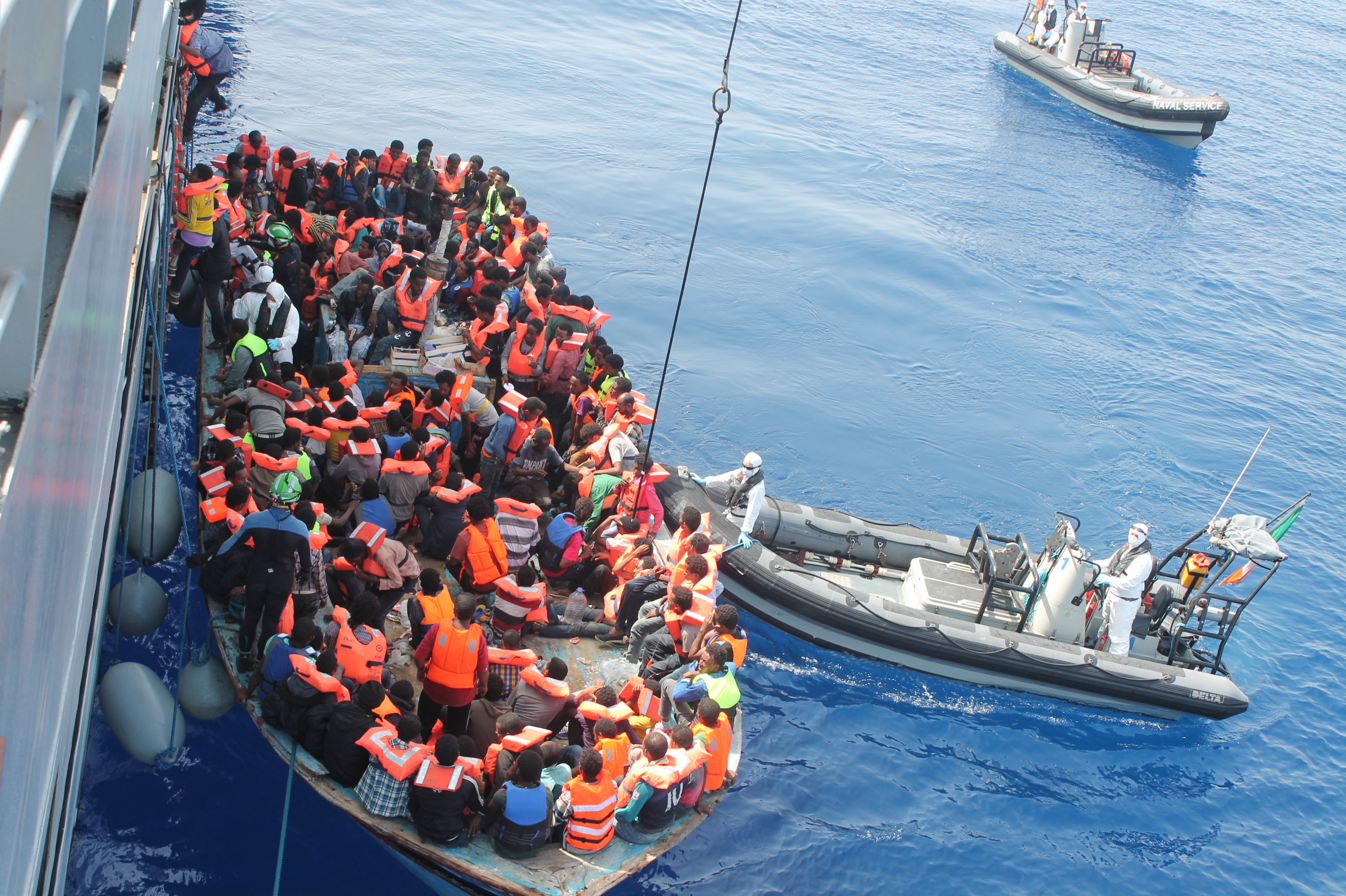
Operation Triton: Irish Naval Service personnel from the patrol ship LÉ Eithne rescuing migrants, 15 June 2015

Operation Triton was an operation conducted by Frontex, the European Union's border security agency. The operation, under Italian control, began on 1 November 2014 and ended on 1 February 2018 when it was replaced by Operation Themis. It involved voluntary contributions from 15 other European nations (both EU member states and non-members). Voluntary contributors to Operation Triton included Croatia, Iceland, Finland, Norway, Sweden, Germany, the Netherlands, France, Spain, Portugal, Austria, Switzerland, Romania, Poland, Lithuania and Malta. The operation was undertaken after Italy ended Operation Mare Nostrum, a sea rescue operation for migrants which had become politically unpopular and costed the Italian government €9 million per month during the 12 months it lasted. The Italian government had requested support from the other EU member states, but the request was declined.

== Assets ==
The operation's assets consisted of two surveillance aircraft, three ships and seven teams of staff to gather intelligence and conduct screening/identification processing. Its budget was estimated at €2.9 million per month.

Refugee and migrant deaths in the Mediterranean Sea, 2011–2016.

Since the operation began, the number of migrants who drowned while crossing the Mediterranean increased dramatically, with the April 2015 Libya migrant shipwrecks resulting in over 1,000 deaths alone. The International Organization for Migration said that deaths at sea had risen nine times after the end of Operation Mare Nostrum. The New York Times reported that early 2015 saw a 1600% increase in the number of migrants drowning while attempting to cross the Mediterranean as compared with the same period in early 2014. In 2015, the Croatian warship Andrija Mohorovičić joined the rescue efforts.

== Funding ==
On 20 April, following the April 2015 Libya migrant shipwrecks, EU ministers proposed to double the size of Operation Triton but that would still leave the mission with fewer resources than the previous Italian-run rescue option (Operation Mare Nostrum) whose budget was more than 3 times as large, had four times the number of aircraft and had a wider mandate to conduct search and rescue operations across the Mediterranean Sea.

On 23 April, at a five-hour emergency summit EU heads of state agreed to triple the budget of Operation Triton to €120 million for 2015–2016. EU leaders claimed that this would allow for the same operational capabilities as Operation Mare Nostrum had had in 2013–2014. As part of the agreement, the United Kingdom agreed to send HMS Bulwark, two naval patrol boats and three helicopters to join the operation. Amnesty International immediately criticized the EU response as "a face-saving not a life-saving operation" and said that "failure to extend Triton’s operational area will fatally undermine today's commitment."

== Events ==
On 14 June 2016, the Dutch frigate HNLMS Van Amstel rescued 193 migrants, who had been at sea for a week. The migrants planned to travel from Egypt to Sicily but panic erupted when the old ship they were on started showing signs of sinking. The Dutch frigate safely escorted them to an Italian harbour.
