= Translator (film) =

The Translator Arabic: المترجم is a feature film directed by Rana Kazkaz and Anas Khalaf. The film was produced with the support of Doha Film Institute's financing grants and has won many awards including the Cannes Film Festival's L'Atelier de la Cinefondation in 2017, the CNC Award at the Istanbul Film Festival's Meetings on the Bridge in 2017, and a Tribeca Alumni Grant in 2018 amongst others.

== Logline ==
A Syrian exile living in Australia returns when his brother is taken arrested by the Assad regime in 2011.

== Awards ==
Award	Year
Audience Award, Biografilm Festival, Italy	2021
Audience Award, Lunel Film Festival, France	2021
Arte Prize of the Cinefondation, Cannes, France	2017
CNC Prize at Meetings on the Bridge, Istanbul, Turkey	2017
