= Mare Nostrum =

Roman expression of dominion over the Mediterranean Sea

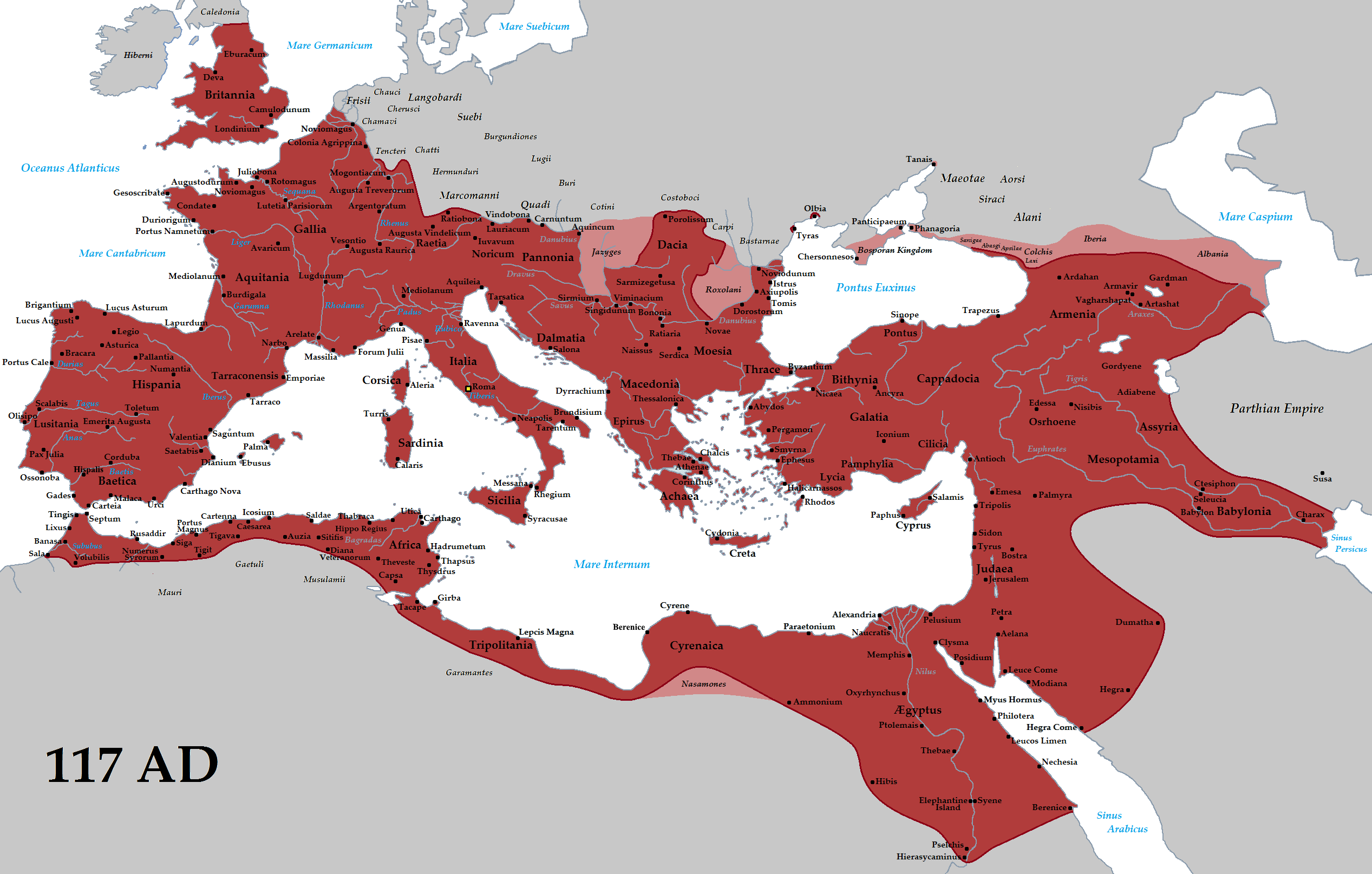
Map showing the greatest territorial extent of the Roman Empire, achieved under Trajan, who died in AD 117. Note, however, that the Mediterranean Sea is called Mare Internum ("Inner Sea") in this modern projection.

In the Roman Empire, Mare Nostrum was a term that referred to the Mediterranean Sea. Meaning "Our Sea" in Latin, it denoted the body of water in the context of borders and policy; Rome remains the only state in history to have controlled the entire Mediterranean coast. The phrase would have been pronounced [ˈma.rɛ ˈnɔs.t̪rʊ̃ː] in Classical Latin, while it is pronounced [ˈmaː.rɛ ˈnɔs.t̪rum] in Ecclesiastical Latin.

The concept of "Mare Nostrum" is noteworthy for having risen to political significance after the unification of Italy in the 19th century, particularly among Italian nationalists and classical fascists, who attempted to revive the term with the connotation of Italy (and the Italian Empire shortly thereafter) being Rome's successor.

== Original usage ==
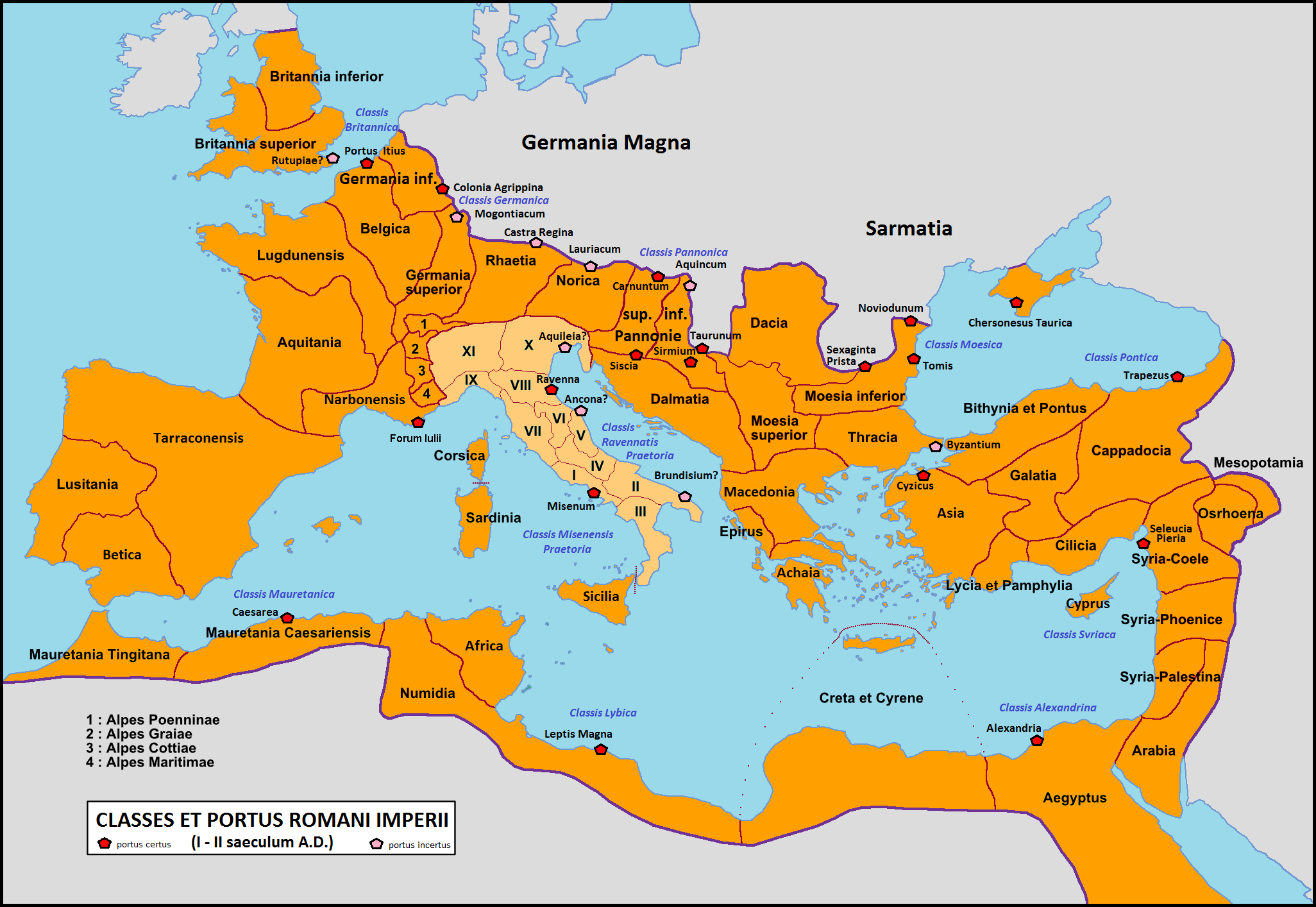
Map of the Roman fleets and major naval bases during the Principate, 27 BC to AD 284.

The term Mare Nostrum originally was used by the Romans to refer to the Tyrrhenian Sea after their conquest of Sicily, Sardinia and Corsica during the Punic Wars with Carthage. By 30 BC, Roman dominion had extended from the Iberian Peninsula to Egypt, and Mare Nostrum began to be used in the context of the whole Mediterranean Sea. Other names were also employed, including Mare Internum ("Internal Sea"), but they did not include Mare Mediterraneum, which was a Late Latin creation that was attested to only well after the Fall of Rome.

== Modern usage ==
=== Italian nationalism ===
Tripolitania and Cyrenaica presented as Italy's two new provinces in a 1912 map of what would later be Italian Libya.

In the decades following the 1861 unification of Italy, Italian nationalists who saw Italy as the successor state to the Roman Empire attempted to revive the term. In particular, the rise of Italian nationalism during the "Scramble for Africa" of the 1880s led to calls for the establishment of an Italian colonial empire, which introduced for the first time a renewed and modern concept of Mare Nostrum:

Even if the coast of Tripoli were a desert, even if it would not support one peasant or one Italian business firm, we still need to take it to avoid being suffocated in Mare Nostrum.

— Emilio Lupi

=== Classical fascism ===
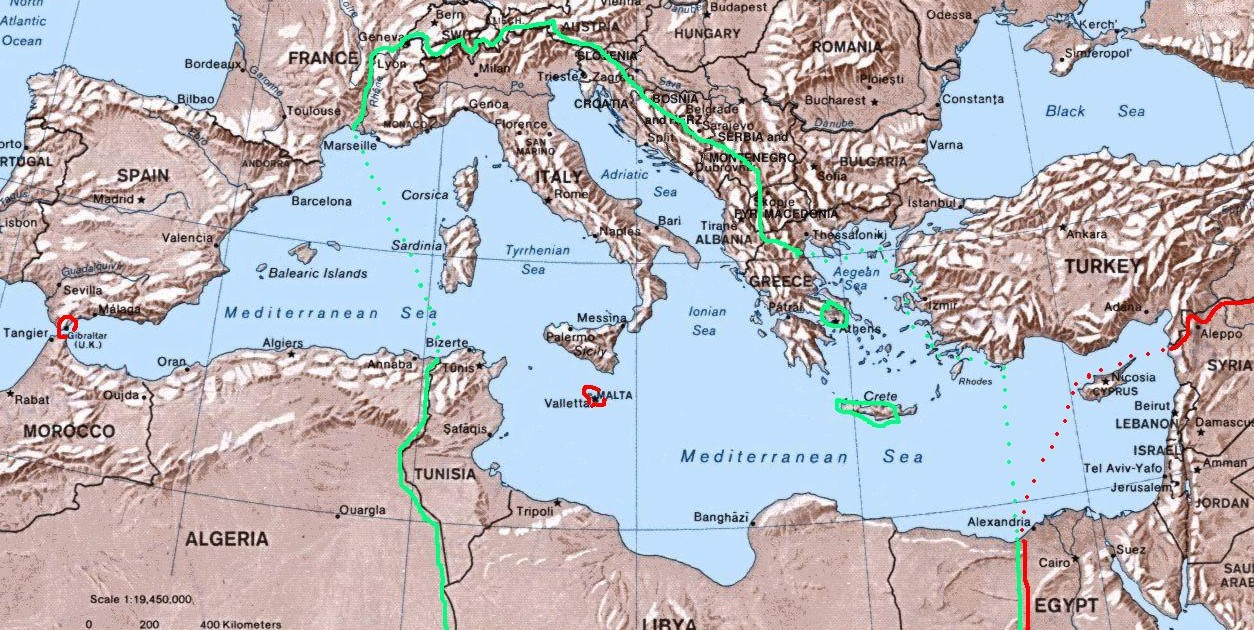
Map of the "Mare Nostrum" of Fascist Italy in the summer of 1942, during World War II: green denotes the territorial control of the Italian Navy; red denotes the territorial control of the Allies.

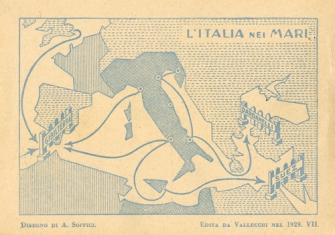
A 1929 Postcard (VII refers to it being year 7 in the Fascist Era that started on October 29, 1922 with the March on Rome made by Ardengo Soffici (1879-1964)

The term was again taken up by Benito Mussolini for use in fascist propaganda, in a similar manner to Adolf Hitler's Lebensraum. Mussolini wanted to re-establish the greatness of the Roman Empire and believed that Italy was the most powerful of the Mediterranean countries after World War I. He declared that "the twentieth century will be a century of Italian power" and created one of the most powerful navies of the world in order to control the Mediterranean Sea.

When World War II started, Italy was already a major Mediterranean power that controlled the north and south shores of the central basin. After the fall of France removed the main threat from the west, the British Mediterranean Fleet, with bases in UK-controlled Gibraltar, Malta, Cyprus, Egypt, and Mandatory Palestine remained the only threat to Italian naval power in the Mediterranean. The invasions of Albania, Greece, Yugoslavia and Egypt, and the Siege of Malta sought to extend Axis control over the Sea. This policy was so far-reaching and potentially intrusive, that it threatened neutral nations like Turkey, a threat that İsmet İnönü, the president of Turkey at the time of war, countered by promising to enter the war only if the Soviet Union joined the Allies.

Mussolini wished to create an Imperial Italy around his own idea of a "Mare Nostrum" and promoted the fascist project—to be realized in a future peace conference after the anticipated Axis victory—of an enlarged Italian Empire, stretching from the Mediterranean shores of Egypt to the Indian Ocean shores of Somalia and eastern Kenya. He referred to making the Mediterranean Sea "an Italian lake". This aim however, was thwarted throughout the campaign by the Allied armies and navies. Italian attempts to conquer Greece failed until German forces arrived to assist the Italian invasion. The Axis saw only brief periods of ascendancy during the Battle of the Mediterranean, prior to the surrender of Italy in September 1943.

== Cultural impact ==
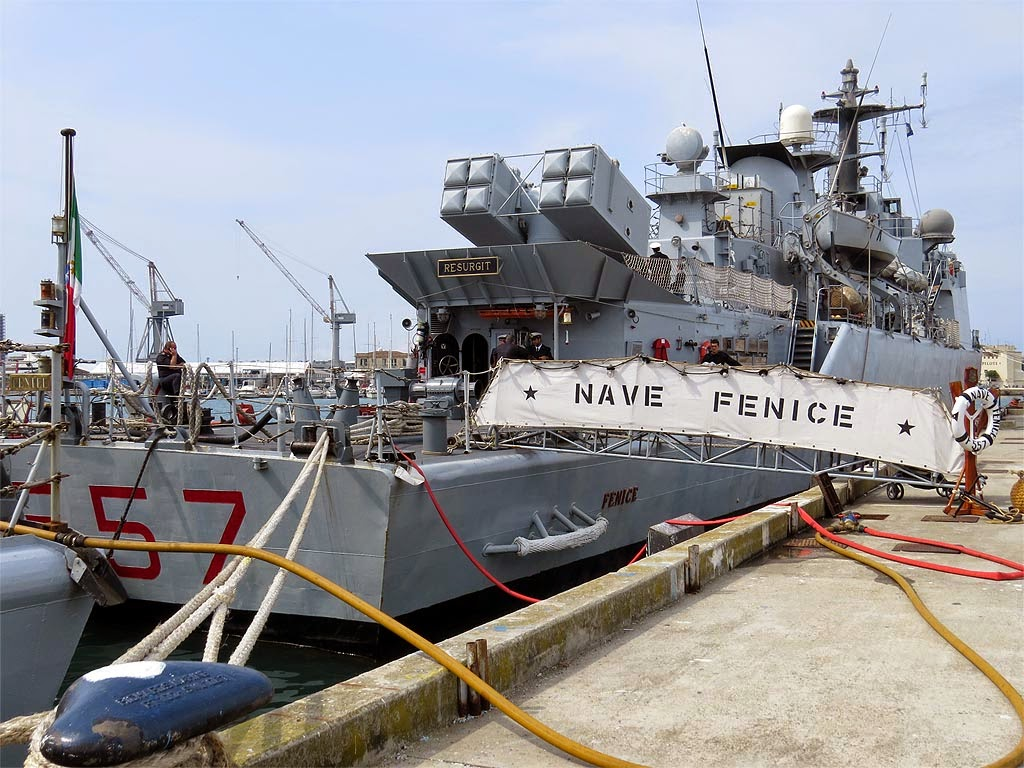
Fenice is one of the eight corvettes of Minerva class with the role of surveillance of fisheries; it took part in Operation Mare Nostrum, aimed at rescuing compromised boats of illegal migrants from North Africa (primarily Libya) and cracking down on human traffickers.

Mare Nostrum is the title of a best-selling novel by Spanish author Vicente Blasco Ibáñez, published in 1918. A film based on it was released in 1948.

The term "Mare Nostrum" was chosen as the theme for the Inaugural Conference of the Society for Mediterranean Law and Culture, being held in June 2012 at the University of Cagliari Faculty of Law, Sardinia, Italy ("La Conferenza Inaugurale della Società di Diritto e Cultura del Mediterraneo"). In this contemporary usage, the term is intended to embrace the full diversity of Mediterranean cultures, with a particular focus on exchanges and cooperation among Mediterranean nations.

Following the 2013 Lampedusa migrant shipwreck, the Italian government decided to strengthen the national system for the patrolling of the Mediterranean Sea by authorizing "Operation Mare Nostrum", a military and humanitarian operation in order to rescue the migrants and arrest the traffickers of immigrants.

== See also ==
- Legacy of the Roman Empire
  - Caput Mundi, a Latin phrase referring to the city of Rome as the world's capital
- Propaganda in Fascist Italy § Mare Nostrum
