= Operation Mare Nostrum =

Operation of the Italian Navy and Coast Guard for the rescue of refugees

Operation Mare Nostrum was a year-long naval and air operation commenced by the Italian government on 18 October 2013, which rescued at least 150,000 migrants on the dangerous Mediterranean sea crossing. The operation ended on 31 October 2014, and was superseded by Frontex's Operation Triton.

== Operation ==
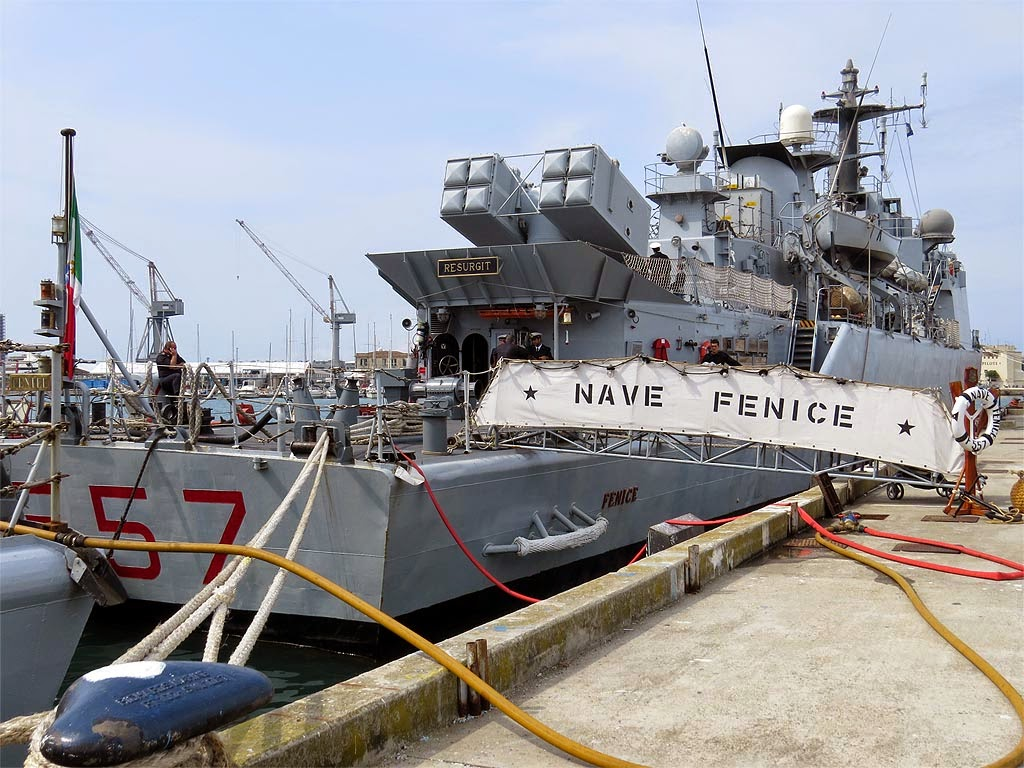
Fenice is one of the eight corvettes of Minerva class with the role of surveillance of fisheries; from November 2013 it took part in the Operation Mare Nostrum rescuing the boats of irregular migrants coming from North Africa.

The operation is named after ancient Roman name in Latin for the Mediterranean (Mare Nostrum, "Our Sea"). The European Commission provided financial support for the operation with €1.8 million from the External Borders Fund. Mare Nostrum was operated by the Italian Navy and saw ships operating near the coast of Libya.

The operation's search and rescue component is claimed by advocacy groups like the European Council on Refugees and Exiles to have saved thousands of lives, but the operation was politically unpopular and extremely costly for just one EU state. The Italian government requested support from the other EU member states, but the request was declined.

The operation ended on 31 October 2014 and was superseded by Frontex's Operation Triton, which operated a smaller search and rescue capability. Unlike Mare Nostrum, Operation Triton focused on border protection rather than search and rescue, and operated closer to the Italian coast. The termination of Mare Nostrum has been criticized as contributing to the increased death rate among migrants headed for Europe in the Mediterranean, which increased tenfold in 2015 compared to migrant fatalities in the Mediterranean in 2014. Two major migrant shipwreck disasters which together killed more than 1,000 people within the span of a week in April 2015 led to calls to renew the operation.

== Deployed assets ==
The operation involved units of the Italian Navy and Italian Air Force. The navy units deployed consisted of:

- 1 amphibious assault carrier with medical and shelter facilities for the would-be migrants;
- 1–2 frigates
- 2 patrol vessels or corvettes with medical care;
- San Marco Marine Brigade team in charge of vessels inspections and the safety of migrants on board;
- coastal radar network and automatic identification system shore stations.

The air units involved helicopters, one MM P180 aircraft equipped with FLIR, two Camcopter S-100 unmanned aerial vehicles on board the ship San Giusto and two maritime patrol aircraft. There was also one forward logistic site on Italy's Lampedusa island for logistics support. According to Italian Interior Minister Angelino Alfano, the government spent about €114 million ($142 million) on Operation Mare Nostrum.

=== Foreign contributions ===
Slovenia was the sole external contributor to the operation. It provided its patrol vessel Triglav, which assisted in general surveillance of the waters surrounding Lampedusa from 15 December 2013 to the end of January the following year.

== See also ==
- 2013 Lampedusa migrant shipwreck
- 2015 Libya migrant shipwrecks
- Operation Triton
- English Channel migrant crisis
