= Ocean Viking =

European humanitarian ship

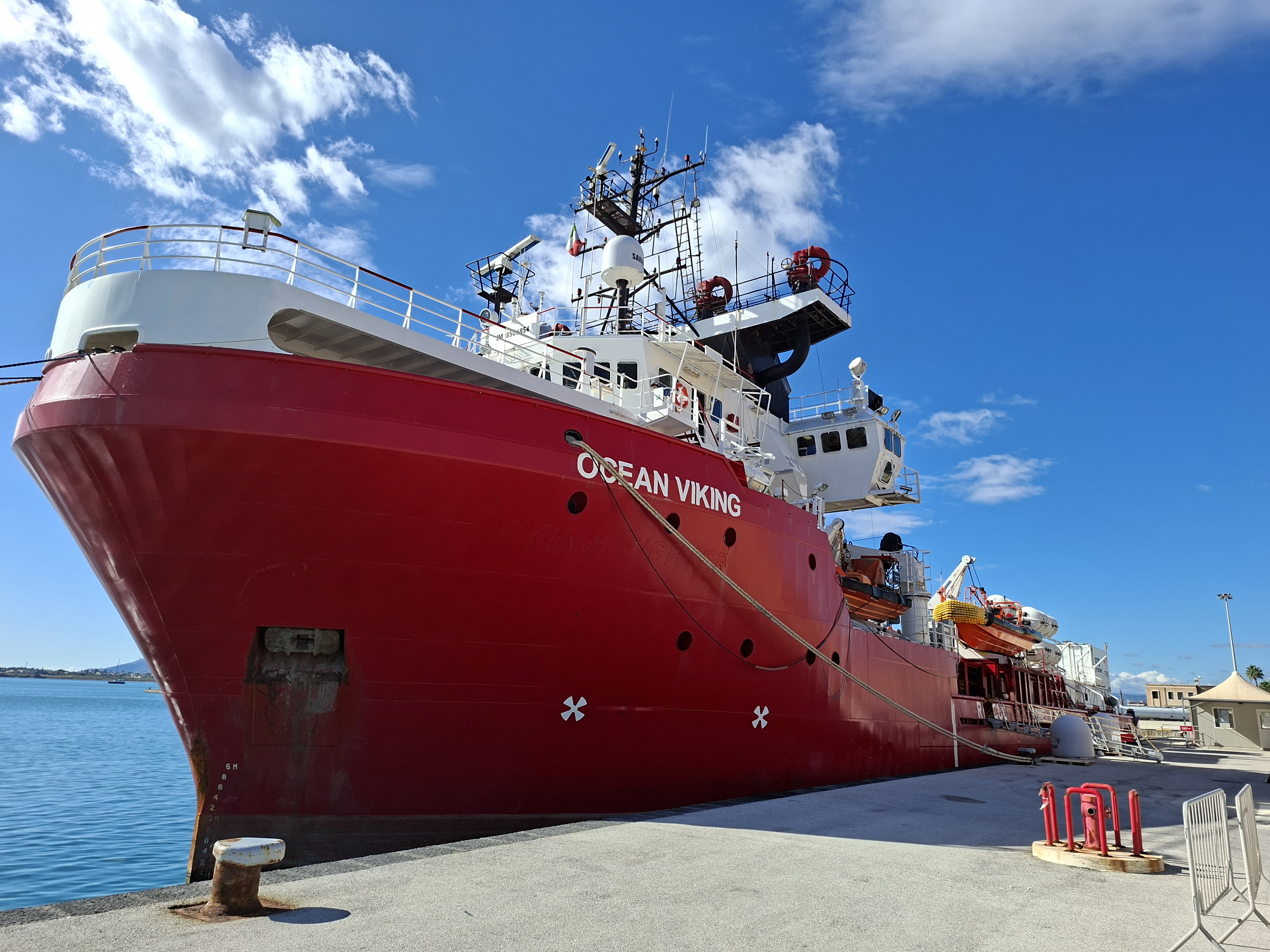

History
- Completed: 1986
- In service: 1986
- Identification: Callsign: JXIW

General characteristics
- Class & type: UT735
- Tonnage: 2,075 GRT
- Length: 69.3 metres (227 ft)
- Beam: 15.5 metres (51 ft)
- Draught: 5.11 metres (16.8 ft)
- Propulsion: 2 x Bergen diesel engines with 22,371 kW (30,000 hp)
- Speed: 15 knots (28 km/h; 17 mph)

The Ocean Viking is a former Platform supply vessel used as a humanitarian ship chartered from July 2019 by the SOS Méditerranée association.

== The vessel ==
The Ocean Viking was built as a Platform supply vessel and put into service in 1986 in Norway.

On 21 July 2019 SOS Méditerranée announced a new rescue campaign off the Libyan coast, using the supply vessel Ocean Viking. The approach is supported by the Norwegian authorities, who have given the vessel a flag. The operation costs €14,000 per day. The vessel, which is 69 m long by 15 m beam, was built in 1986 to serve as a support vessel for oil rigs in the North Sea. It is operated by around thirty people (nine crew members, a search and rescue team and medical personnel) and can carry up to 200 passengers. It is faster and better equipped than the Aquarius. Onboard microphones and cameras will make it possible to record everything that happens on board and around the boat, in order to possibly prove that the work was carried out within a legal framework The ship, which will respect the ban on disembarking migrants in Italian ports is even banned from refueling in Malta.

In 2024 French SOS Méditerranée president François Thomas estimated the cost for a day at sea for the Ocean Viking to be around €24,000.

== Selected list of interventions ==
During its first outing, four rescue missions on 9, 10 and 11 August 2019, brought the number of refugees on board to 356, to which were added a further 160 from on board the ship Open Arms.

By 29 January 2020, when 407 migrants (recovered after five night rescue operations in less than 72 hours off Libya) disembarked in Taranto, the number of people saved thanks to the operations of this ship had mounted to more than 1,600.

The ship was impounded for five months from July 2020, during which time additional equipment had been added, and released on 21 December 2020. Ocean Viking resumed operations in January 2021, embarking journalists from Mediapart. The crew rescued 119 migrants off the Libyan coast on 21 January 2021; two more rescues the next day brought the number of migrants on board to 374. They disembarked on 25 January at Augusta in Sicily.

At the end of March 2021, the Ocean Viking was stranded to the south of Malta, pending permission to disembark 116 migrants rescued the previous week. The crew of the ship then tried to rescue further migrants during the sinking of 22 April 2021 in the Mediterranean, but without success.

On 28 March 2022, SOS Méditerranée announced via Twitter that it had received permission to bring almost 160 migrants rescued in the Mediterranean to Italy. The Ocean Viking headed to the port of Augusta in Sicily. On 11 November 2022, the Ocean Viking arrived in the southern French port of Toulon with 234 people.

On 25 March 2023, Ocean Viking was notified by Alarm Phone of a distress call in international waters. On the way to the emergency situation, the Libyan Coast Guard harassed the Ocean Viking and warning shots were fired in the air. The Ocean Viking had to turn away to protect itself while people fell into the water from the boat in distress. Video footage from a Sea Watch aircraft that observed and documented the maritime emergency was posted on Twitter.

On 2 May 2023, the Ocean Viking docked in Civitavecchia near Rome with 168 migrants.

On 7 July 2023, the Ocean Viking and its fast support vehicles initially picked up 40 people from a GRP boat off the Libyan coast. After a Libyan Coast Guard speedboat showed up, the only Arabic-speaking activist negotiated the rescue of people from another boat, which had since been spotted by an NGO plane a few nautical miles away. Apparently the Libyans also agreed to the rescue of these migrants - but then began to hinder the activists a little later with disruptive maneuvers and warning shots. Two days later, 57 migrants were landed in Civitavecchia and the Italian authorities initially detained the ship. Just a few days after landing, 10 Sudanese, Eritreans and Ethiopians, said to be between 14 and 17 years old, fled the accommodation assigned to them by the Italian authorities and went into hiding.

On 13 March 2024, the vessel rescued 25 survivors from an inflatable dinghy, from which some 60 others had died.

On 24 August 2025 the Ocean Viking approached the Libyan coastline to conduct a search operation. The crew claimed to have been about 40 nautical miles off the coast, when the ship was engaged by a Libyan coast guard vessel, whose crew demanded the activists should leave the area. After several warnings, the Libyan crew opened fire, circling the Ocean Viking, and continued shooting with small arms for some 20 minutes, damaging super structure and equipment. Nobody was injured. The activists finally retreated and Italian authorities assigned them Marina di Massa to disembark the 87 migrants they had picked up earlier, but the captain decided that they couldn't make it safely and headed for Syracuse on Sicily instead.

In late January 2026 storm "Harry" was designated as a powerful Mediterranean low with wave heights recorded up to 16 meters. The Ocean Viking crew recovered bodies of migrants who had drowned in the cyclone between Tunisia and Malta. The estimated number of casualties among the migrants trying to reach Europe during the storm was given officially by the guardia costiera as some 380 people missing, while some activists estimated up to 1000 people dead.

In late March 2026 the activists headed for Tunisia to pick up 112 migrants from a Miskar gas field drill platform, where they were stranded after their vessel had sunk. Italian authorities assigned Marina di Carrara for disembarking, where the Ocean Viking arrived on 23 March. 39 of the migrants claimed to be unaccompanied minors.

On 3 August 2026 the activists landed 14 migrants, who originate from sub-saharan Africa, in the port of Brindisi. About a month later, on 11 September 2026, 75 migrants were disembarked at the port of Salerno. An additional group of 23 migrants was picked up in mid September and was due to arrive in Carrara on 21 September 2026.

== See also ==
- List of migrant vessel incidents on the Mediterranean Sea
- List of ships for the rescue of refugees in the Mediterranean Sea
- Timeline of the European migrant crisis
- Mediterranean Sea refugee smuggling
- Proactiva Open Arms
- Salvamento Marítimo Humanitario
