= Aita Mari =

Maydayterraneo maritime rescue ship

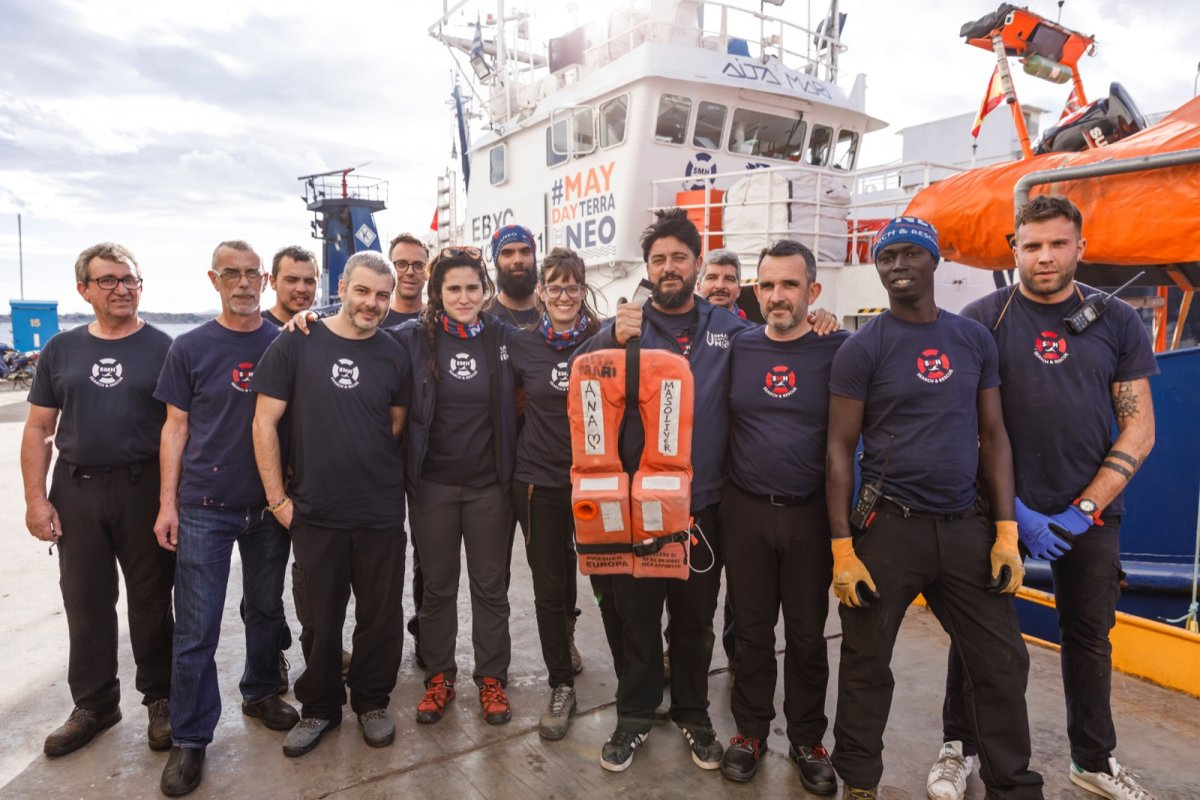
- Aita Mari and crew in 2020

History
- Name: Stella Maris Beria (2002-2017); Aita Mari (2018)
- Owner: Salvamento Marítimo Humanitario
- Port of registry: Spain
- Builder: Astilleros de Pasaia, S.A. - Pasajes
- Yard number: 311
- Launched: 2002
- Identification: MMSI number: 224069840

General characteristics
- Type: Fishing vessel (2002-2017); Rescue ship (2018)
- Tonnage: 161 GT
- Length: 32-metre (105 ft 0 in)
- Beam: 7.1-metre (23 ft 4 in)

The Aita Mari is a ship of the Maydayterraneo(sic) maritime rescue project, launched by Salvamento Marítimo Humanitario (SMH, Humanitarian Maritime Rescue) in 2017, in view of the European migrant crisis in the Central Mediterranean. SMH, a non-governmental organization, refurbished the Stella Maris Beria (an old tuna fishing boat) to rescue people from the waters of the Mediterranean.

The project has saved the lives of dozens of migrants in the Mediterranean, as well as the lives of some fishermen. Sometimes it did so despite clashes with governments.

The ship was named after a sailor from Zumaia, Aita Mari (1809–1866) who is particularly celebrated for the rescue of 3 sailors from the boat San Jose in 1861, and who died at sea in another attempted rescue.

The ship was built in 2002; it is 32 meters long with a gross tonnage of 161 tons.

== Example rescues ==
In February 2021 the ship rescued 102 persons from a boat near Malta. A further 46 from a second vessel heading towards Europe could not be embarked, but were provided with assistance.

In July 2024, during what was described as its thirteenth mission, the Aita Mari rescued 34 people.

The ship and its work can be followed on the Vessel Tracker website.

== Aita Mari documentary ==
Filmmaker and photographer Javi Julio went to the Greek island of Lesbos in 2019 with members of SMH. He produced the documentary Aita Mari with his photographs. The project took two years to make, and the video premiered on 28 April 2021 at the San Sebastian Human Rights Film Festival.

== See also ==
- List of migrant vessel incidents on the Mediterranean Sea – Migrant vessel sinkings in the Mediterranean Sea
- List of ships for the rescue of refugees in the Mediterranean Sea
- Timeline of the European migrant crisis
- Mediterranean Sea refugee smuggling
- Hellenic Rescue Team – Greek non-governmental search and rescue organisation
- Iuventa – Non-governmental organization from Berlin
- Proactiva Open Arms – Spanish search and rescue organization
- SOS Méditerranée – European NGO for the rescue of life at sea
