= Astral (yacht) =

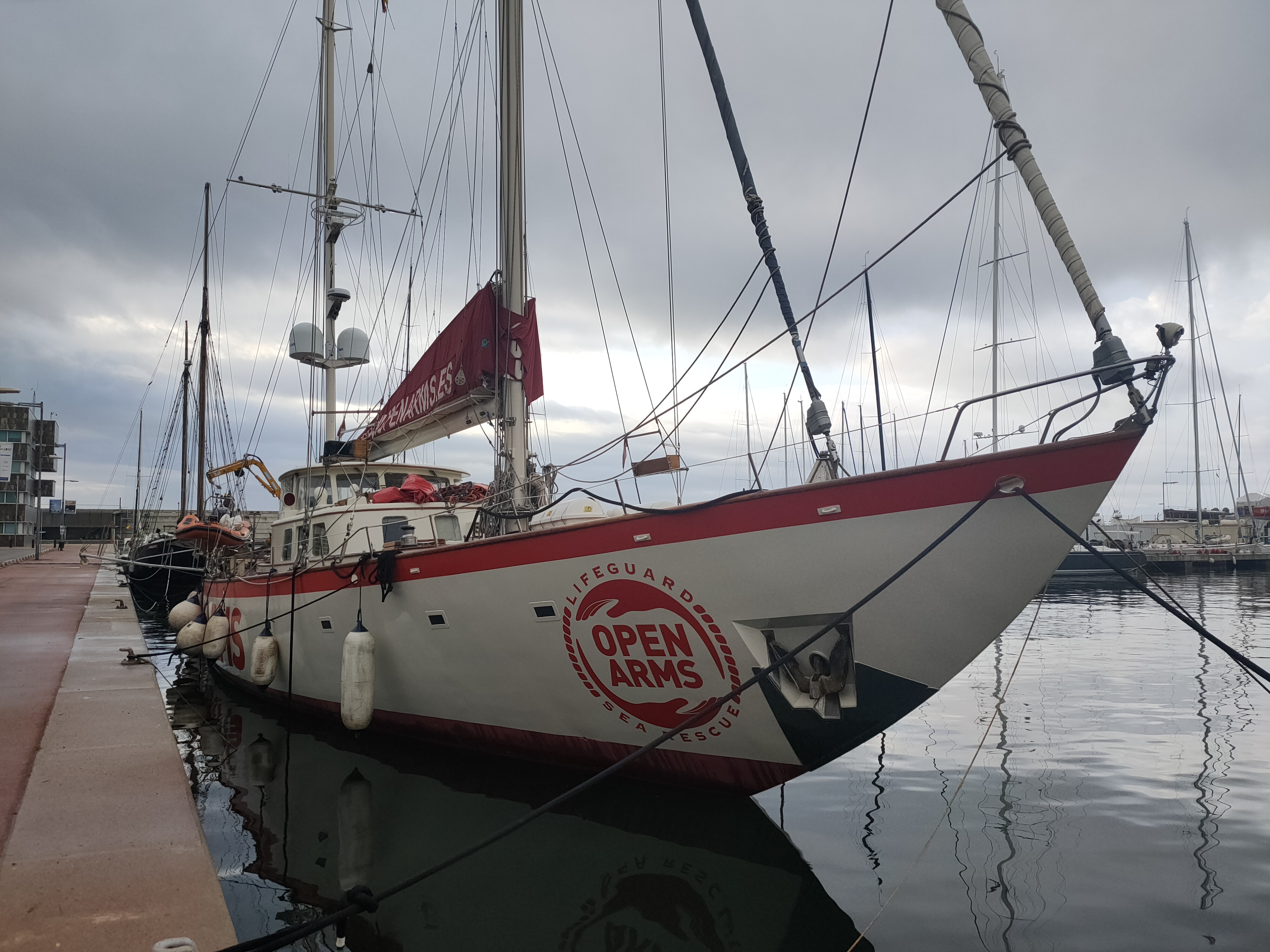
View of the bow of the Astral, docked at the port of Badalona, 2022

The yacht Astral is a 30m ketch-rigged sailing yacht which was donated to Mediterranea Saving Humans (MSH) in 2016 by Livio Lo Monaco, head of Grupo Lo Monaco. Astral is a steel-hulled vessel and was designed by Philip Rhodes and built at Kröger Werft Rendsburg in 1970.

In operating the yacht, Mediterranea Saving Humans also has the support of the German association Sea-Watch and the Spanish Proactiva Open Arms (POA).

== Technical ==
In addition to her sailing capability, Astral has motor power from two 300hp Caterpillar diesel engines. Her speed is given as 10knots (cruising) and 12knots (maximum); her beam is 7.22m and her draught 4.1m Prior to conversion for rescue operations, she had been refitted in 2009.

== Film ==
Astral featured in a documentary which was recorded on board during the same month that MSH received her by Jordi Évole for Salvados, directed by Évole for Atresmedia Televisión. The box office takings from the documentary, shown at cinemas throughout Catalunya before being broadcast on TV, were earmarked in their entirety for MSH.

== Selected reports of SAR activities ==
On one day in August 2016, Astral took on some 200 refugees.

A year later, formally announcing their support for Proactiva Open Arms, the Eugin Group described Astral as a 'flagship' for the rescue of refugees.

In August 2019, the Astral was reported to have saved 157 persons on a single mission.

At the end of 2016, Astral was augmented by the acquisition by POA of Golfo Azzurro, a fishing trawler 43 metres in length and 8 metres beam. However MSH continued to use the Astral in the Mediterranean, and in June 2020 when Astral returned to POA activity in the Mediterranean, Òscar Camps, head of MSH, tweeted that 2020 would be Astral's fourth year in the Mediterranean.

== Awards ==
The Astral received the ALBA Human Rights Award in April 2017.
