= Open Arms (watercraft) =

Tugboat launched in 1974

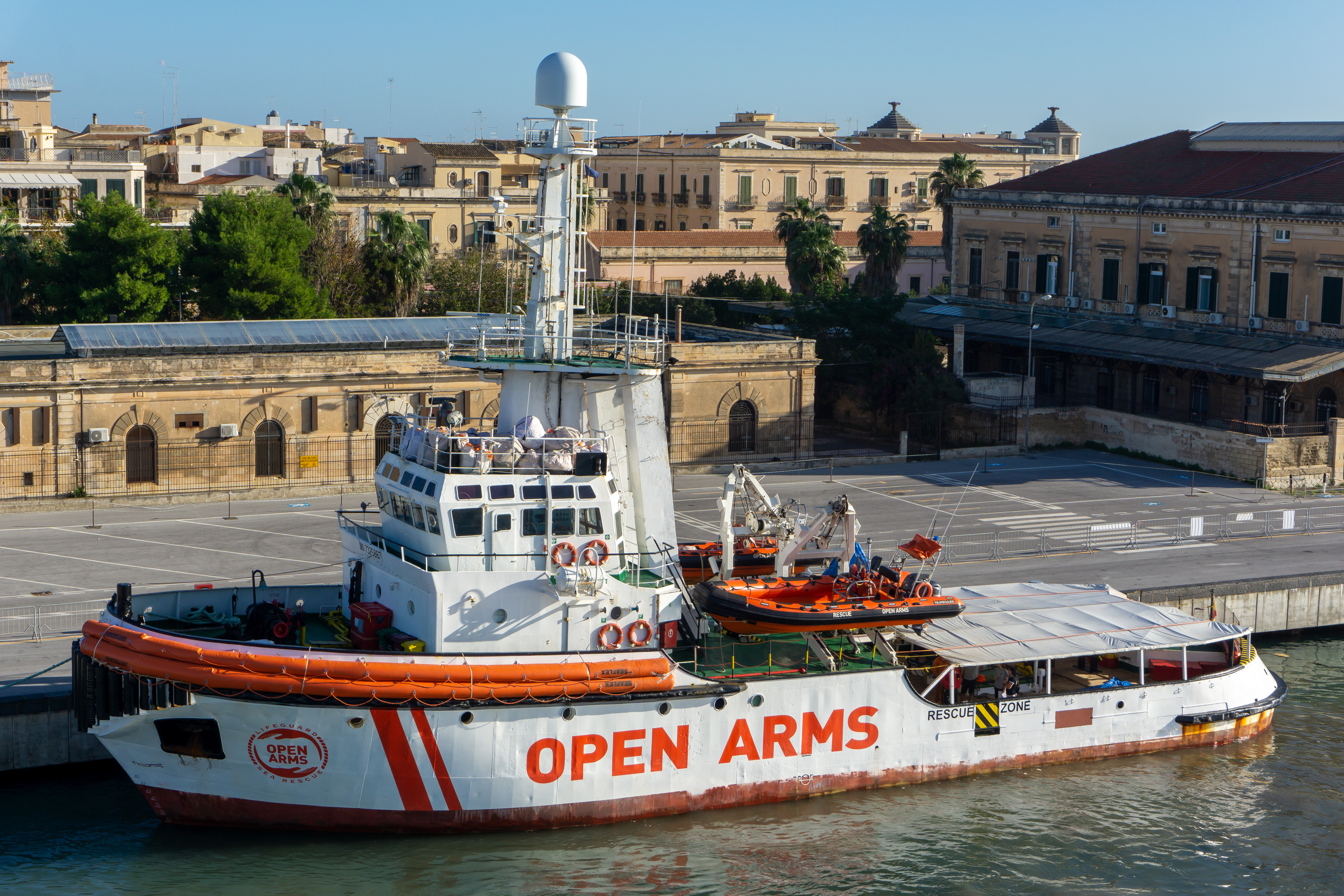
- Open Arms in Syracuse, Italy 2019

History

Spain
- Name: Open Arms

General characteristics
- Length: 36.9 m
- Beam: 9.5 m

Open Arms is a Mediterranean rescue vessel operated by the Proactiva Open Arms NGO. Before 2018, it was named Ibaizabal Tres.

The vessel is 37 meters (121 feet) long and its work can be followed online.

== Operations ==
In November 2018, a joint campaign was launched by Proactive Open Arms, SOS Méditerranée and Sea-Watch, which used Open Arms, Mare Jonio and Sea-Watch 3, along with the Moonbird aircraft, to continue with the rescue of refugees in the Mediterranean. This followed after a few weeks during which the states had prevented them from acting in various ways.

In August 2019, while the boat was off Lampedusa and prevented from entering port for a period that eventually extended to 19 days, the actor Richard Gere arranged delivery of supplies and went aboard to distribute them to the refugees.

During the course of 2019, the vessel rescued a total of 324 people from the sea.

In November 2020, Open Arms rescued 250 people in one week.

On 5 October 2023, the ship was confiscated by Italian authorities, after rescuing 176 people from three vessels in distress on 30 September 2023, in violation of rules demanding immediate return to port after each individual rescue.

=== 2024 Gaza maritime corridor ===
The ship began delivering food to the Gaza Strip in March 2024, towing a loaded barge, via a maritime corridor negotiated by the Cypriot government. The loaded barge contained around 200 tons of food during each delivery.

=== 2026 ===
On 24 June 2026 the activists transported 14 migrants to Ortona. All originated from Eritrea and had started their attempt to cross the Mediterranean Sea in Tripoli on 21 June. On 2 July 2026 the activists took 85 migrants from Egypt, Somalia and Bangladesh on board, who had left from Misrata 4 days prior. Italian authorities ordered the ship to proceed to Savona in Northern Italy for disembarkation. A few days later, on 9 July, a group of 16 men from Egypt and Somalia were picked up off Libya, seven migrants claimed to be unaccompanied minors. The activists were designated the port of Ravenna for disembarkation. 6 migrants from Somalia were picked up from a small boat on 22 July and the activists were assigned the port of Salerno for disembarkation from Italian authorities.

== See also ==
- List of migrant vessel incidents on the Mediterranean Sea
- List of ships for the rescue of refugees in the Mediterranean Sea
- Timeline of the European migrant crisis
- Mediterranean Sea refugee smuggling
- Aita Mari
- Hellenic Rescue Team
- Iuventa
- Mediterranea Saving Humans
- Migrant Offshore Aid Station
- No Border network
- Proactiva Open Arms
- Sea Watch
- SOS Méditerranée
