= Open Arms =

Open Arms may refer to:

== Songs ==
- "Open Arms" (Journey song), 1981, covered by Celine Dion, Mariah Carey, Younha, Low, and Collin Raye
- "Open Arms" (SZA song), 2022
- "Open Arms" (Tina Turner song), 2004
- "Open Arms", a song by Lloyd Banks from the 2012 mixtape V.6: The Gift
- "Open Arms", a song by Tracy Chapman from the 1992 album Matters of the Heart
- "Open Arms", a song by Elbow from the 2011 album Build a Rocket Boys!
- "Open Arms", a song by Gary Go from the 2009 album Gary Go
- "Open Arms", a song by Michael W. Smith from the 2006 album Stand
- "Open Arms", a song by Jorge Rivera-Herrans from Epic: The Musical

== Other uses ==
- Open Arms (watercraft), Spanish rescue vessel
  - Proactiva Open Arms, Spanish search and rescue at sea NGO
- Open arms test, which measures laboratory rodent anxiety
- Open Arms, a 1990s alias of English musician Graham Turner of Flip & Fill
- Open Arms, a detective novel by Vince Cable, 2017
