= April 2021 Mediterranean shipwreck =

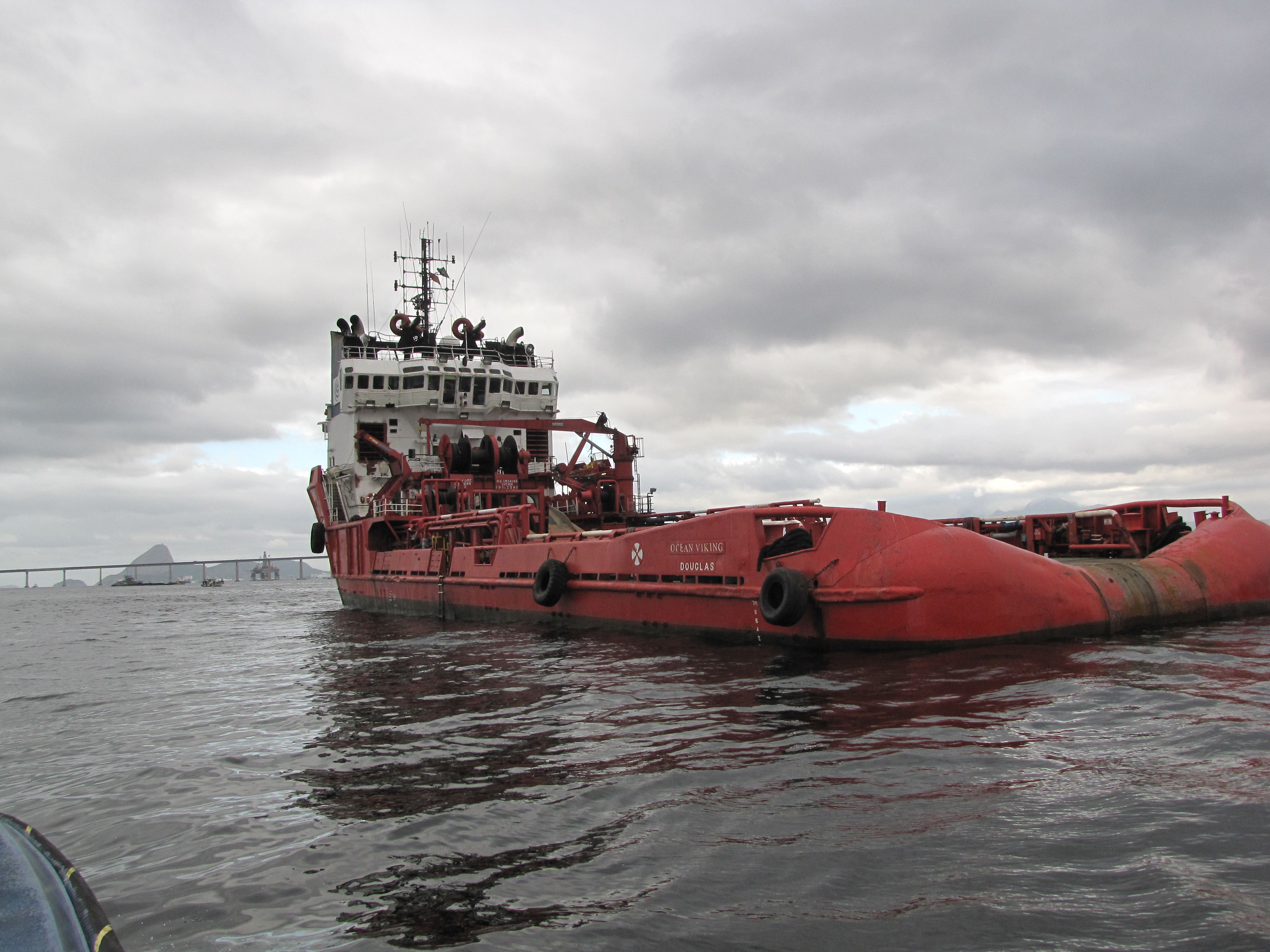
Ocean Viking of the NGO SOS Méditerranée (SOS Mediterranean), which participated in the search operations.

On April 22, 2021, a boat carrying around 130 migrants of sub-Saharan origin sank off the coast of Libya. The disaster led to the death of all the people sailing on the small boat.

== Situation ==
On April 23, 2021, the NGO SOS Méditerranée, based in Marseille, informed the media that it had spotted around ten bodies off the coast of Libya near an overturned inflatable boat which had already been reported in distress. The boat carried 130 people on board. No survivors were found during the search operations carried out by the ship Ocean Viking, chartered by this NGO, as well as three merchant ships.

The NGO Alarm Phone blames this sinking on the European side denying responsibility for the boat, and the incompetence of the coast guards.

== Consequences ==
This tragedy increases the human death toll from shipwrecks in the central Mediterranean. According to the International Organization for Migration, at least 355 people had already been known to have lost their lives in this maritime zone in 2021. Adding the people missing as a result of this shipwreck, the cumulative death toll is 453 migrants.

== Reactions ==
The French NGO SOS Méditerranée accused the European Union and Libya by issuing this statement: “States are abdicating their responsibility to coordinate search and rescue operations, leaving private actors and civil society to fill the deadly void they leave behind them. We can see the result of this deliberate inaction in the sea around us."

According to Pope Francis, “One hundred and thirty migrants died in the sea. They are persons, human lives, who for two entire days implored in vain for help, help that didn’t arrive. Let us pray for these brothers and sisters, let us interrogate all of ourselves about this latest tragedy. It is a moment of shame."
