= Morské oko =

Morské oko may refer to two lakes:

- Morské oko, Slovakia, lake in Slovakia
- Malé Morské oko, Slovakia, lake in Slovakia
- Morskie Oko, mountain lake in Poland

== See also ==
- Sea Eye Lake, lake in Russia
