= Phoenix (1973) =

History
- Name: GC Bassin
- Builder: Davie Shipbuilding, Lauzon
- Launched: 1973

History
- Name: NSS Pattam
- Acquired: 2002

History
- Name: Phoenix, Phoenix 1
- Owner: Phoenix Charters, Indianapolis, IN, US
- Port of registry: Belize
- Acquired: 2007
- Identification: IMO number: 7234272; MMSI number: 312204000; Call sign: V3RI6
- Status: in active service

General characteristics
- Tonnage: 483 GT; 396 DWT
- Length: 39.9 metres (131 ft)
- Beam: 9.4 metres (31 ft)
- Draught: 4.6 metres (15 ft)
- Crew: 16
- Aircraft carried: 2 Schiebel Camcopter S-100s

The Phoenix is a ship built by Davie Shipbuilding in Lévis, Quebec and launched as the trawler GC Bassin in 1973. Since then, her roles have included a research vessel and a training ship, before her current use by the Migrant Offshore Aid Station as a rescue vessel, rescuing people in distress at the Mediterranean Sea.

== Background ==
The Phoenix was built by Davie Shipbuilding in Lévis, Quebec and launched as the trawler GC Bassin in 1973. Subsequently, she was given to Gorden-Pew fisheries. In 2002, she was renamed as NSS Pattam, before being given her current name in 2007. She has been previously used as a research vessel and training ship, before her current use as a rescue vessel.

== Migrant Offshore Aid Station ==
On 25 August 2014, the NGO Migrant Offshore Aid Station (MOAS) launched the Phoenix as a support vessel to aid vessels in distress in the Mediterranean Sea. Her inaugural mission continued until October 2014.

The Phoenix is based in Malta and funded by Christopher and Regina Catrambone, who were inspired by an appeal from Pope Francis and the Lampedusa shipwrecks in October 2013. She is equipped with two Schiebel Camcopter S-100 unmanned aerial vehicles, dinghies and other life-saving equipment together with paramedics with the aim of saving migrants, refugees and other people in distress at sea.

=== First operation: 2014 ===
Her inaugural mission lasted from 25 August 2014 until October 2014. During her first mission, The ship responded to requests from local rescue coordination centres while cruising the Mediterranean. The running cost of the first mission was €2 million, the extent of the funder's budget.

On 4 October 2014, while en route to Pozzallo, Sicily the Phoenix rescued 106 migrants in a rubber dinghy.

On 19 October 2014, the Phoenix rescued 97 African migrants from the Gambia, Senegal, Guinea Bissau, Niger, Mali, Sierra Leone and Benin who had been at sea for 12 hours, after receiving direction from rescue coordination centre in Rome.

On 20 October 2014, the Phoenix rescued 274 migrants, including 200 Syrians and Pakistanis from a 15-metre wooden boat off the coast of Italy.

The MOAS has helped to save 3,000 migrants during its first mission.

=== Second operation: 2015 ===
The Phoenix and MOAS returned to the Mediterranean in 2015, rescuing and helping 8,581 people crossing from Libya to Italy.

=== Third operation and beyond ===
The Phoenix continued rescue operations in 2016, assisted by a second MOAS-operated ship, the Topaz Responder. Together MOAS helped to rescue 19,450 people. In 2017, the Phoenix, assisted by a fixed-wing aircraft supported the rescue of 7,286 people. After August 2017, MOAS focussed its resources and the Phoenix on the Rohingya refugee crisis, and Mediterranean operations were integrated into the Italian Maritime Rescue Coordination Centre, Rome.

== See also ==
- Cap Anamur
- Martin Xuereb
