= Migrant Offshore Aid Station =

Maltese humanitarian organization

- Formation: 2013
- Headquarters: Malta
- Founder: Christopher Catrambone
- Website: https://www.moas.eu/

The Migrant Offshore Aid Station (MOAS) is an international humanitarian non-governmental organization based in Malta that provides aid and assistance to vulnerable communities worldwide. MOAS main focus is responding quickly and efficiently to emerging crises and make a difference in people's lives.

Most activities between 2014 and 2017 have focused on sea-rescue of refugees and migrants. From 2017 missions have centered around healthcare to Rohingya refugees in Bangladesh, and then expanded in the provision of specialised training for water and fire response - Disaster Risk Reduction that is currently underway.

Since 2019 MOAS has been delivering food and medical aid in areas of crisis such as Yemen, Somalia and Sudan, in collaboration with international partners.

Since 2022 MOAS has been saving lives in Ukraine with an emergency medical mission, through a team of 150 medics who operates a fleet of 50 ambulances. They managed to save 40.000 patients as of March 2024.

== Awards ==
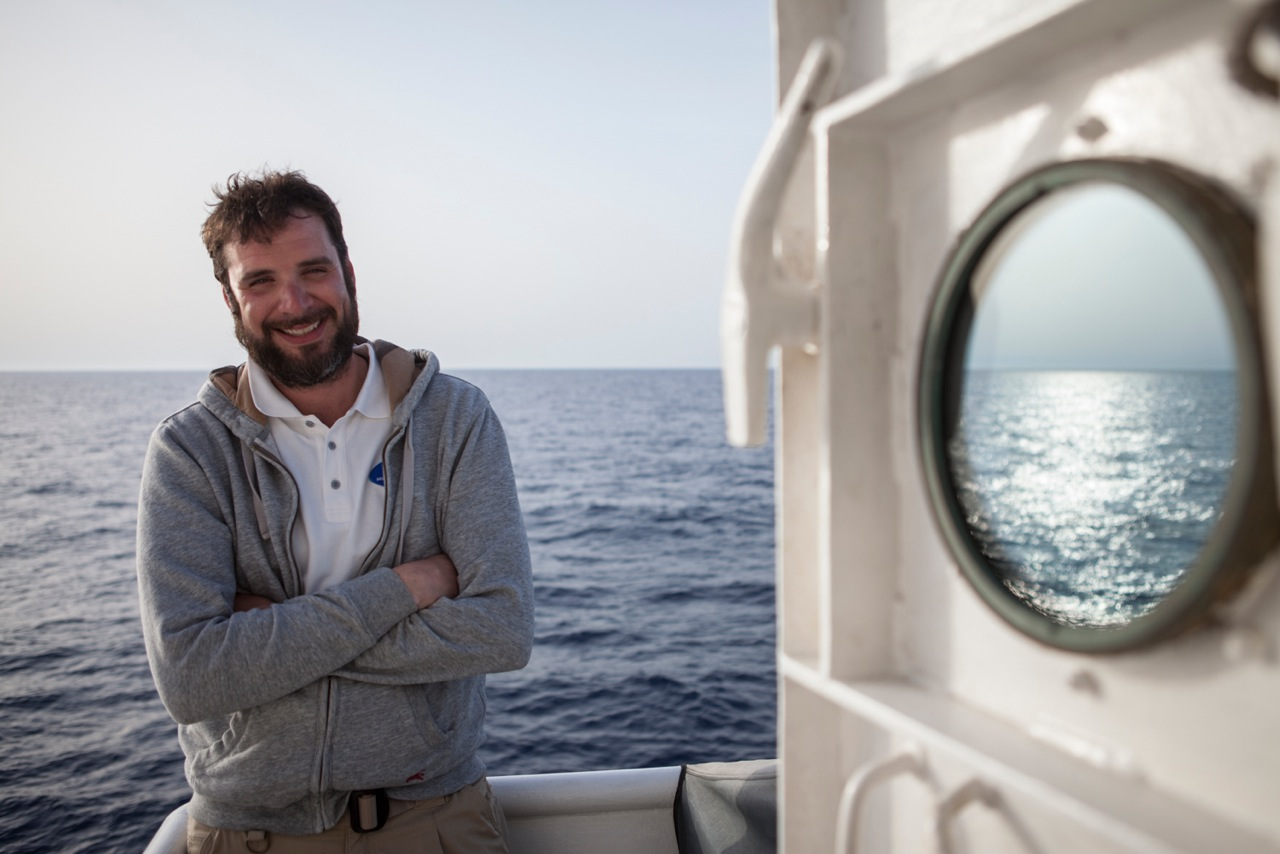
Founder Chris Catrambone on Phoenix

MOAS was founded in 2013 in the wake of the escalation of the migration phenomenon through the Central Mediterranean, which quickly became the most deadly migrant crossing in the world.

MOAS has been awarded Italy's Order of Merit and Malta's Medal for Service for the Republic (Midalja għall-Qadi tar-Repubblika). MOAS also received an award from Civic Engagement by the Today Public Policy Institute in November 2015. In 2016, MOAS received The Geuzen Medal.

== Activities ==
=== 2014 first mission in the Central Mediterranean ===
The first activities was a 21-day mission of the Phoenix vessel that commenced on 25 August 2014, the first rescue was a Maltese fisherman whose boat was drifting off Delimara (close to Marsaxlokk) after its engine failed. The man managed to attract the attention of the MOAS crew by waving. The three-metre fishing vessel was tied up alongside the Phoenix until help was called.

MOAS organized its first migrant rescue on 30 August when it assisted a group of 250 Syrians and Palestinians, including 40 children. On the same day, the Phoenix also assisted 96 people travelling from Sub-Saharan Africa in a rubber dinghy who were transferred onto a merchant ship. On 8 September, the Phoenix conducted two rescues involving almost 700 people migrants, 83 women and children. A two-day-old infant was among the people rescued.

On the subsequent day, another 500 migrants were rescued from two separate vessels, bringing the tally up to 1,500 migrants saved in less than two weeks at sea. MOAS rescued another 1,500 migrants throughout October, bringing the total number of rescues to 3,000.

MOAS launched a crowdfunding effort in October and by 2015 raised $70,000. In February 2015, MOAS made a specific appeal to the maritime industry and mariners who are required to respond to emergencies. It said that seafarers transiting the Mediterranean would be especially affected by the numbers of refugees crossing from Libya to Italy after projects like the Italian mission Mare Nostrum were no longer in operation.

=== 2015 mission in the Central Mediterranean ===
MOAS continued to operate in the Central Mediterranean Sea from May to September 2015, during which time it assisted almost 9,000 refugees, bringing its total number of rescues until the end of 2015 to 12,000.

Doctors Without Borders partnered with MOAS from May to September 2015 on board the MY Phoenix where they cared for 6,985 people rescued at sea after rescue by MOAS. The 6 person team included a logistician, a communications specialist, and medical staff who cared for migrants on board the Phoenix. Rescued people suffered from a range conditions including from dehydration and gunshot wounds.

=== Mission in the Aegean Sea: December 2015 to March 2016 ===
MOAS funding raising revenue was significantly increased following an increase in public awareness of the need for sea rescue in the aftermath of the death of Alan Kurdi, enabling MOAS to expand its work to the Aegean Sea between December 2015 and April 2016.

On 2 January, it announced that it has assisted a boat of 39 migrants, 11 of whom were injured by the violent impact on the sharp island rocks. A three-month old infant boy was severely hypothermic and was stabilized. On 12 January 2016, MOAS assisted a vessel of Syrian refugees who had washed ashore on the island of Agathonisi. The group included a two-year-old boy who became the first known migrant casualty that year.

For this mission, MOAS used the Topaz Responder, a 51-meter custom-made emergency response vessel, which hosts two high-speed rescue launches. These smaller rescue vessels are named Alan and Galip, in honour of the Kurdi brothers.

In April 2016, the sharp fall in attempted crossings in the aftermath of the EU-Turkey deal and unfolding mass tragedies in the Central Mediterranean prompted the repositioning of all MOAS assets to the Central Mediterranean.

=== 2016 mission in the Central Mediterranean ===
MOAS launched its 2016 Central Mediterranean operation on 6 June, rescuing and assisting over 20,000 people in 2016, during which MOAS' search and rescue vessels operated in international waters 12-16 nautical miles off the coast of Libya. The 2016 Mission was run in conjunction with operational partners Red Cross Italy, who provided vital medical and psychosocial assistance, cultural mediation, food, clothing and emergency resources to the beneficiaries while they were on board.

=== 2017 mission in the Central Mediterranean ===
MOAS launched its 2017 Central Mediterranean operation on 1 April using the Phoenix and with their own medical team, and supported by a remotely-piloted drone. Over the Easter Weekend Rescue, MOAS' crew members rescued an estimated 1,500 people.

In September 2017, MOAS announced the ending of their missions in the Mediterranean, in order to divert resources to assisting Myanmar's threatened Rohingya group of Muslims.

=== Myanmar and Bangladesh ===
Following an earlier fact-finding mission in 2015-2016 using the MV Phoenix, MOAS arrived in Bangladesh on 3 September 2017 to conduct a needs assessment of the unfolding humanitarian crisis. On 1 October 2017 the Phoenix completed the first of two aid deliveries, transporting of 40 tonnes of food.

MOAS has established two field clinics where Rohingya refugees can receive primary and secondary medical care and where the host Bangladeshi community can access their emergency services. The first clinic was opened 14 October 2017 in the fishing community of Shamlapur, near where refugees arrive by sea, the second was opened on 10 November 2017 to serve the remote refugee settlement of Unchiprang.

The clinics offer provide triage, pharmacy, reproductive, maternal neonatal and pediatrics health services. Each clinic has a recovery suite, a maternity room, a surgical area, and an ambulance.

The clinics are staffed with doctors, nurses, midwives, pharmacists and logisticians, and treat up to 300 people every day for conditions including trauma, acute respiratory illnesses, gastric distress, malnutrition and fatigue. Over 40% of their patients are children.

In 2018, MOAS again sent the Phoenix to the Bay of Bengal to assist fleeing Rohingya Muslims.

Since 2019, MOAS has shifted its focus to Disaster Risk Reduction, offering training in Flood, Water, and Fire Safety in refugee camps and host communities. This initiative equips refugee volunteers and local participants with life-saving skills to respond promptly to water-related and fire emergencies and potential catastrophes.

=== Aid Deliveries in Areas of Crisis ===
In Yemen, Somalia, and Sudan, MOAS delivers life-saving famine relief, ensuring the timely distribution of ready-to-use therapeutic foods and pharmaceutical supplies to local partners.

=== MOAS Mission in Ukraine ===
Responding to the crisis in Ukraine in February 2022, MOAS initiated a comprehensive program providing emergency medical care and first response services. With a fleet of 50 fully-equipped ambulances, their skilled teams of 150 medical professionals have saved over 40.000 lives on the frontline and more than 28,000 in communities cut-off from medical infrastructure.

Moreover, MOAS, in collaboration with the Ronald McDonald House Charity (Latvia), MHP Gromadi, and the Oksana Dmytriieva Charitable Foundation, operates a Mobile Medical Unit, offering Primary Health services to support civil communities and aiming for a reduction in mortality and equitable healthcare access for all those affected by the conflict.

=== MOAS in Malta ===
In Malta, MOAS runs diverse projects assisting migrant communities, fostering integration, and promoting solidarity through educational, personal development, sports, well-being, and English language classes. The Remote Learning project ensures connectivity for families and adult learners, providing tablets and modems to facilitate continuous education. Simultaneously, Information and Learning Centres in AWAS-run open centers serve as multifunctional learning spaces.

=== Funding ===
MOAS' 60-day first migrant rescue mission was funded through the contributions of the founder and donations from private citizens.

From 2015, MOAS was privately funded through the support of the public, grant-making organisations, crowd-funding initiatives, foundations and corporate sponsorship. Operational partners, including MSF, Emergency, and Red Cross Italy with the support of the International Federation of the Red Cross, have also been major contributors to the mission in the Mediterranean Sea.

Among their operational partners: Edesia Nutrition, ADRA Yemen, IMC Somalia and ADRA Sudan (aid deliveries), Ronald McDonald House Charity, MHP Gromadi and the Oksana Dmytriieva Charitable Foundation (Ukraine mission), UNHCR, WFP, Helvetas, Cyclone Preparedness Programme CPPs (DRR).

Today, MOAS continues to be primarily supported by grant-making foundations, corporate sponsorship, and donations from private citizens.

== See also ==
- Hellenic Rescue Team
- Iuventa
- Mediterranea Saving Humans
- No Border network
- Proactiva Open Arms
- Sea Watch
- SOS Méditerranée
