= Salvamento Marítimo Humanitario =

Spain-based non-governmental organization

Salvamento Marítimo Humanitario (lit. 'Humanitarian Maritime Rescue'; SMH) is a non-governmental organization (NGO) that is governed by the principles of "volunteering, solidarity, humanity, universality, equality, impartiality and dignity" founded in Zarautz (Gipuzkoa) in 2015.

It was created as a rescue group to reinforce the response in the massive arrivals of inflatable dinghies with migrants on the island of Chios, in the Aegean Sea. After the pact of the European Union and Turkey and the consequent reduction in arrivals, the project in Greece adapted to new needs and transformed into a health team. In May 2017, SMH reached a collaboration agreement with another rescue NGO, Proem-Aid, to found the 'Maydayterraneo-Aita Mari' project. This initiative consists of a rescue ship in the Central Mediterranean, in international waters off the coast of Libya. As of 2021, SMH operates| the Aita Mari rescue ship. The Aita Mari can be followed on the Vessel Tracker website.

== Greece ==
In the winter of 2015, the constant arrival of inflatable dinghies on the shores of Chios overwhelmed the Greek coastguards. In December alone, more than 13,000 people landed on this island. For this reason, volunteers from SMH travelled there with a team of two ambulances and a rescue boat.

After the pact between the European Union and Turkey, and the consequent decrease in arrivals, a medical team was created to care for the people living in the refugee camp. Thus, during 2016, they provided "primary and secondary health transport and emergency care through ambulances to more than 878 people".

Since August 2017, SMH has been reinforcing medical assistance in Vial, the Chíos registration camp, and is responsible for care in the afternoon shift, emergencies at nights and weekends and for primary health care among the arrivals.

Outside the camp, it collaborates with other solidarity groups: Athena Women Center, Action for Education, and Hero Center, to give more specific attention to vulnerable people. This work is carried out by a team made up of volunteers, refugees (such as translators) and expatriate and Greek staff.

== Central Mediterranean ==
Humanitarian Maritime Rescue and ProemAid signed a collaboration agreement in May 2017 to launch the 'Maydayterraneo-Aita Mari' rescue project.

The main objective of this initiative is to prevent the death of people on their journey through the Central Mediterranean. In addition, the project aims to monitor compliance with human rights by the different resources deployed in the area to contain the migratory flow.

In the autumn of 2017, Maydayterraneo agreed with Mission Lifeline to charter a rescue ship. In these joint operations, 577 people who were adrift in seven boats in international waters were located and assisted. They were transferred to a safe harbor in Sicily, as required by the United Nations Convention on the Law of the Sea.

=== Aita Mari ===
In 2018, 'Maydayterraneo-Aita Mari' managed to raise the necessary funds to purchase and equip its own rescue ship, the Aita Mari.

This ship, under the Spanish flag, was originally a purse-seine fishing vessel (Stella Maris Berria) of the Cantabrian fleet, based in Getaria (Guipúzcoa), built in 2001, 32 meters in length and 7 meters beam. For rescue work, she has two 6m semi-rigid boats and substantial recovery equipment, as well as rescue rafts with capacity for 150 people.

She is also equipped with a health area equipped with emergency assistance and advanced life support technology. Her crew is made up of 16 people: deck and engine officers, deck and engine sailors, cook, medical, sanitary and rescue personnel, and a media team.

The ship was named in honor of José María Zubía Cigarán (Aita Mari). This sailor from Gipuzkoa was recognized for his courage by never hesitating to jump into the sea and rescue those in distress.

Among all the attendees there was one who did not settle for the passive response from the majority, and calling his people, he got on a small boat and left the dock with the intention of helping the shipwrecked. It was José María Zubia, 'Mari', who was seen appearing and disappearing with his boat while he controlled the rudder directing the four men who handled the oars

-Javier Sada.

He died carrying out a rescue in January 1866. In the port in San Sebastián, there is a bust in his honor.

By early 2024, the ship had sailed on 12 rescue missions, with the most recent saving 43 people from Egypt, Sudan and Bangladesh.

== Financing ==
Salvamento Marítimo Humanitario is a non-profit association and is financed in four ways: annual contributions from its members, one-off anonymous donations from individuals and companies, solidarity events and emergency aid funds from town halls, councils and regional governments.

The Basque Government contributed financially to the purchase and remodeling of the Aita Mari. As Jonan Fernández, General Secretary for Human Rights, Coexistence and Cooperation of the Basque Government explained on 7 June 2018 at a press conference in San Sebastián, this ship "will represent the commitment to action and solidarity of Basque society in the midst from a sea of lack of solidarity and injustice".

He underlined in that act that this collaboration is part of his Government's Plan for Coexistence and Human Rights for 2017–2020 because "the actions of a government such as the Basque must try, with all modesty, but with all determination, to join forces in the international arena to defend respect for human rights".

== Acknowledgments ==
In 2016, Salvamento Marítimo Humanitario received the René Cassin Peace and Coexistence Prize awarded each year by the Basque Government.

The same year the organisation was recognized with the solidarity Heart and Passport without Borders award granted by the Gipuzkoa Provincial Council.

In 2017, Salvamento Marítimo Humanitario was awarded the Lion Heart by the Lions Clubs organization.

In 2018, the association received the Solidarity at Sea Award jointly awarded by the Ruiz-Gálvez law firm and the Spanish Maritime Institute (Instituto Marítimo Español).
