= Golfo Azzurro =

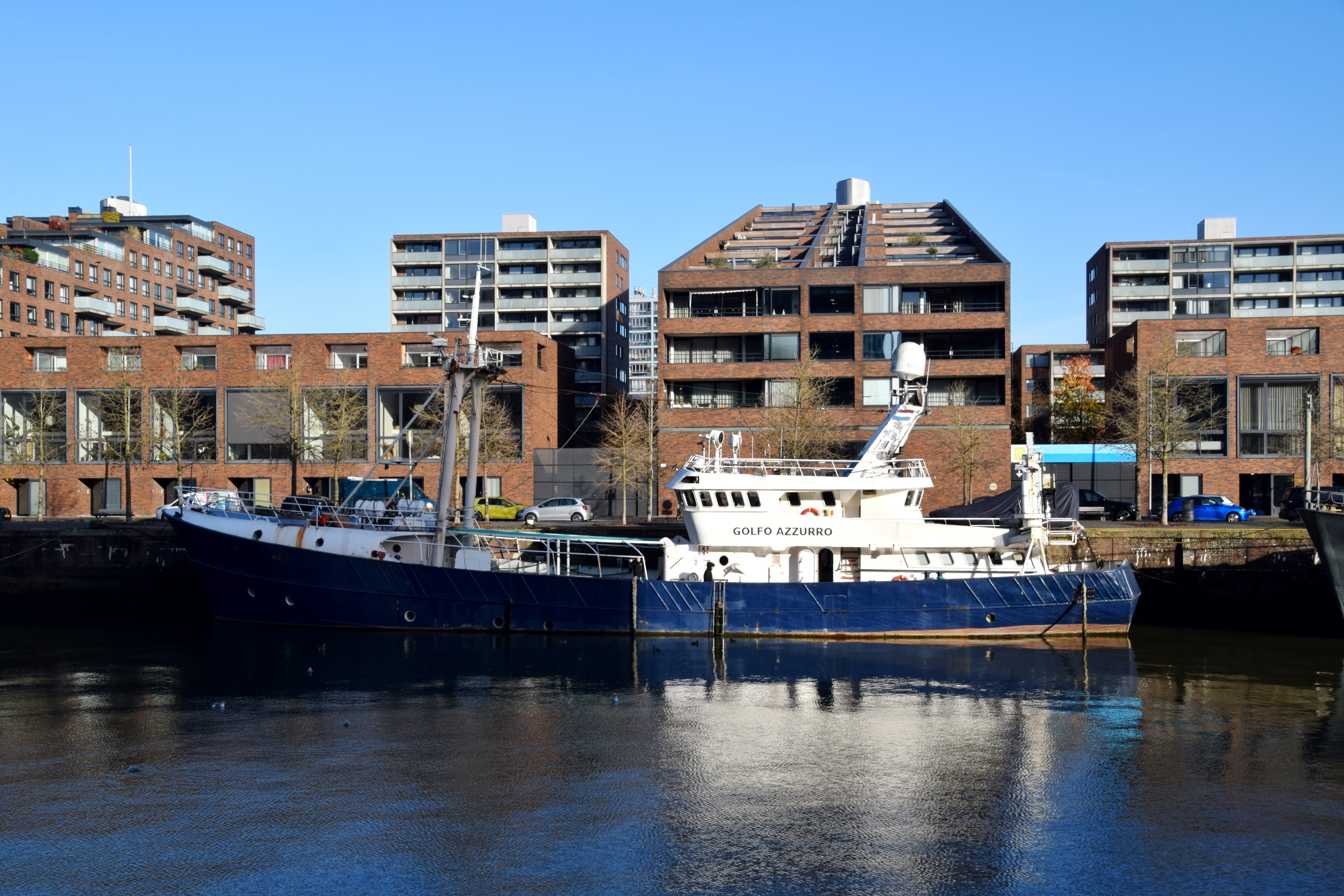

History

Republic of Panama
- Name: Golfo Azzurro
- Owner: Stichting All Oceans
- Builder: Visser Den Helder
- Yard number: 111
- Completed: 1987
- Renamed: 2010
- Home port: Hamburg
- Identification: IMO number: 8505721

General characteristics
- Tonnage: 350
- Length: 42.81 metres (140.5 ft)
- Beam: 8.5 metres (28 ft)
- Draught: 4.42 metres (14.5 ft)
- Installed power: 2350 HP
- Propulsion: Caterpillar
- Speed: 13 knots (24 km/h; 15 mph)

The North Sea trawler MS Golfo Azzurro was launched in 1987 as the Maarten Cornelis, and was the first trawler in the Netherlands equipped with the EUR SumWing. From 2016-2017 it was chartered by the Spanish NGO Proactiva Open Arms and was used for search and rescue operations near Libyan waters.

== Career ==
As the TX 33 Maarten Cornelis, in 2009 she was used to test the "SumWing" which caused less seabed disturbance than traditional beam trawl because the wing hovers above the seabed when fishing. It also used less fuel than traditional trawling.

In 2010 the ship was leased by the Golfo Azzurro Foundation who partnered with the Sea Shepherd Conservation Society and, using funds from the Brigitte Bardot Foundation, used the ship for covert surveillance operations in the Danish Protectorate of the Faroe Islands.

On August 17 the ship was boarded and searched by the Danish Police and then let go under escort of the Royal Danish Navy. Denmark's Thetis class frigate Triton was assigned to monitor their actions.

In June 2016 the Golfo Azzurro invited the 'Boat Refuge Foundation', a Dutch foundation, to go for a search and rescue to save refugees in the Mediterranean Sea. The vessel was managed by Adrian J. Sonneveld, Captain and shipmanager. The Search and Rescue operation was managed by the Italian Coastguard. Golfo Azzuro operated under the Panama Flag. The Boat Refuge Foundation chartered the vessel for a symbolic price. The board of the Golfo Azzurro Foundation is based in Rotterdam.

The NGO Boat Refuge Foundation stopped search and rescue operations in November 2016 and in December 2016 the Spanish NGO Proactiva Open Arms chartered the Golfo Azzurro and started search and rescue near Libyan waters. At that time Proactiva Open Arms was already doing successful search and rescue with the sailing vessel ASTRAL.

During the search and rescue operations in the Mediterranean, between August 2016 and August 2017, the Golfo Azzurro rescued over 8500 women, men and children, and supported other NGOs with about 1500 people in distress. Like other rescue ships it faced intimidation from Libyan coastguards.

During the first months of search and rescue operations René Hazenkamp from the Netherlands (one of the crew members; the cook) made a docu-movie about the Golfo Azzurro and her crew. This movie, GANGWAY TO A FUTURE, had its premiere in January 2018 at the International Film Festival Rotterdam.
