= Òscar Camps =

Spanish lifeguard and activist

Òscar Camps Gausachs
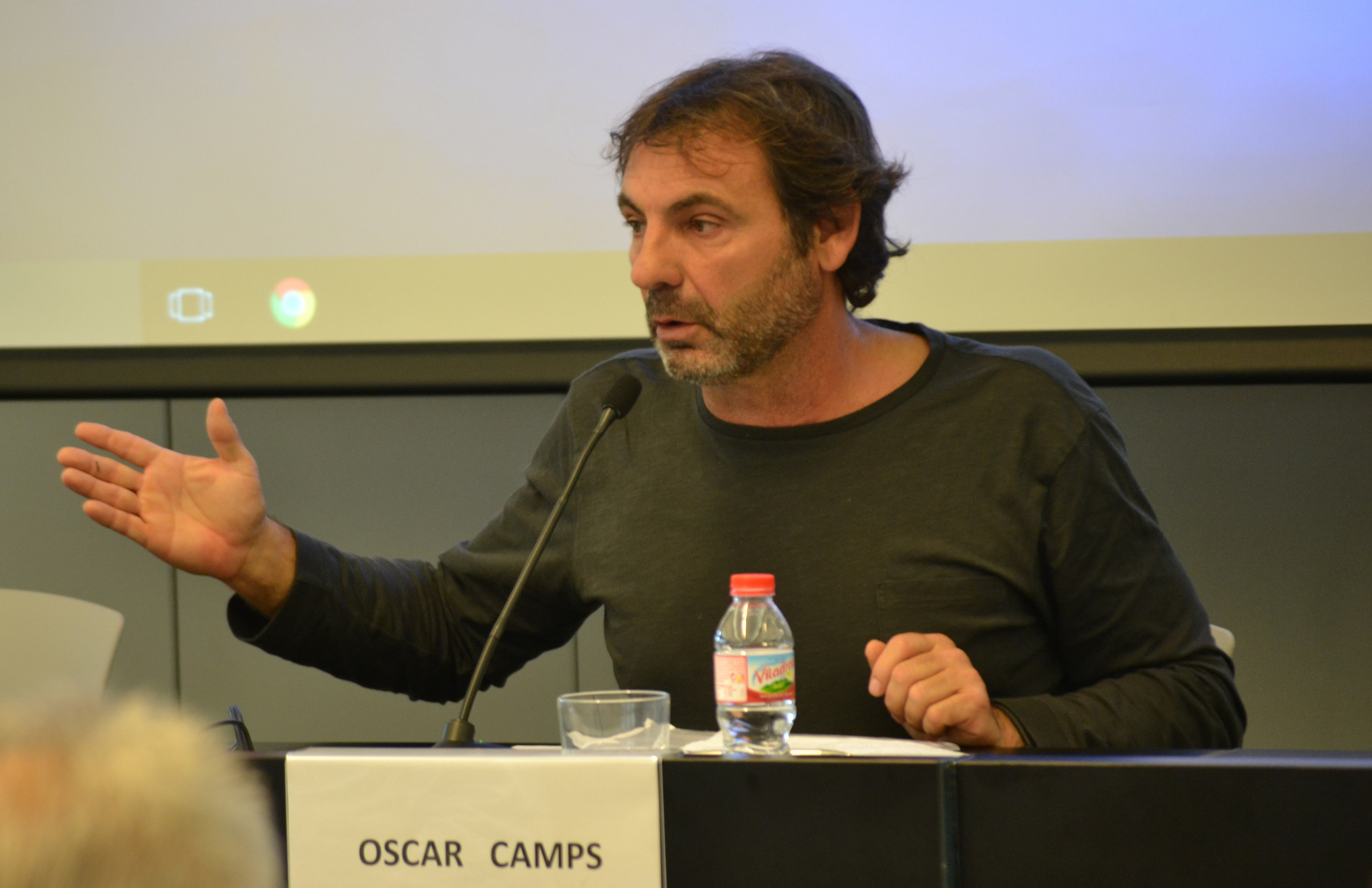
- Born: 28 November 1963 (age 62); Barcelona
- Occupation: lifeguard

Òscar Camps Gausachs (Barcelona, 28 November 1963), is a Catalan lifeguard, entrepreneur and activist, known mainly for being the founder and director of the NGO Proactiva Open Arms. He was awarded the Catalan Prize of the Year in 2015.

Born in Barcelona, Camps was the owner of a lifeguard company based in Badalona, Pro-Activa Serveis Aquatics, which was dedicated to maritime services, specifically water security and lifeguarding. In the context of the European migrant crisis, during the Syrian civil war, when thousands were losing their lives trying to reach Europe, Camps decided to move to Lesbos, a Greek island near Turkey, to evaluate the situation on the ground. The key event that prompted him to move was the posting of images of the body of Alan Kurdi, a three-year-old boy who had died while trying to cross the border with his family. He and a few colleagues decided to apply their lifesaving expertise to help rescue refugees trying to reach the European Union via the Aegean Sea.

In September 2015 a group of volunteers decided to found the NGO Proactiva Open Arms, funded with 15,000 euros, and went to the island by work on rescue tasks. At first, the only material they had were various wetsuits, fins and snorkels. The group's main activities were to guide and help refugees to reach the beaches; the refugees were mainly Syrians, who came from Turkey in very precarious boats. Over time, however, the available equipment improved, mainly through donations from individuals.

Spanish and European media reported the activity of Camps and the NGO in Lesbos, mainly due to their visibility in photos uploaded to the internet. For example TV3 broadcast the 'To Kyma' documentary where the group's activity was monitored in various actions on the Greek island. On March 2, 2016, Camps and Proactiva were able to visit the European Parliament, where they spoke on behalf of refugees.

== Awards ==
Camps received the 2015 Catalan of the Year Award. He also received the Medal of Honor of the Parliament of Catalonia in recognition of his humanitarian work through Proactiva Open Arms next to Carola Rackete.
