= Grupo Lo Monaco =

Spanish company

Grupo Lo Monaco or Lo Monaco Group is a Spanish company based in Granada (Andalusia) and founded by Livio Lo Monaco and Beatriz Muñoz. Lo Monaco Group is known mainly for selling rest equipment and for introducing latex mattresses in Spain, however the company began by selling homeware products.

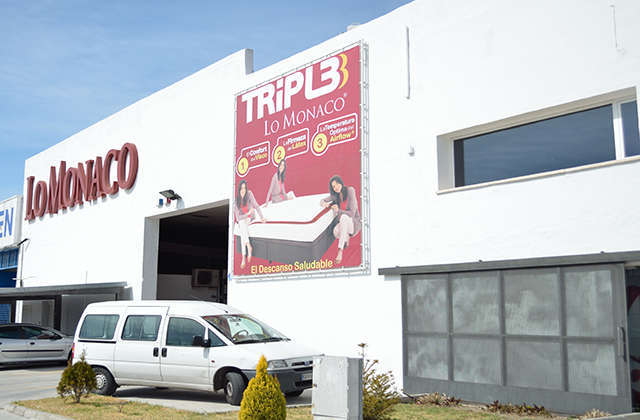
Lo Monaco Group Headquarters(Granada)

== History ==
In 1996, the company began through the sale of homeware products by direct and distance selling. Lo Monaco used television advertising campaigns based on the professional experience of the founders in Italian companies with similar marketing systems. In 1998, the company started selling rest–related products.

In 1999, Lo Monaco began commercializing in the Spanish market, selling latex mattresses. Since then, mattresses have been the company's main product. Between 2002 and 2005, the company expanded and later abandoned its line of homeware, focusing solely on resting products. This change and increase in business required managers to rethink the company's internal structure. Currently, the company has a board of directors consisting of the two original founders and two external directors, José Luis Llano Nueno and Michelangelo. Alfredo de la Moneda is currently the managing director (2002–present).

In 2005, the group beganLo Monaco Hogar Canary, responsible for commercializing the Group's products in the Canary Islands and Lo Monaco Distribution to vertically integrate the logistics. In January of the same year, Miguel Angel Llano became the chief executive officer and the company increased its profitability. In 2007, the company suffered changes motivated by the need to adapt to new market trends, culminating with the launch of a viscoelastic mattress.

== Sleeping technology ==
In 2010, Group Lo Monaco introduced a mattress base which allowed the sleeper to personalize the rest equipment on the basis of the morphological characteristics of the sleeper. In 2011, the company started selling a new mattress with three sleeping features: comfort, stability and optimal temperature. This new mattress is the result of study in the R&D department of Lo Monaco.

== Logistics management ==
The group has a 50% co-shared company, focusing on logistics: Lo Monaco Distribution, based in Guadalajara, focuses on Mexican territory distribution. This company facilitates the delivery, installation and removal of the products sold in that area. From Andalusia, everything is managed from Granada, the headquarters of the Group.

== Corporate responsibility ==
The company has worked with the program Pillows & Pillows – Desarrollo & Development of the Women Together foundation: a multicultural and multiethnic project which sought the creation of a distribution channel for independent artisans. Lo Monaco Group facilitated filling the cushions that were exhibited in the samples and the foundation presented the work of many women artisans from various countries around the world.

The group has also collaborated with other foundations including: Intervida Foundation, Casa del Agua de Coco, Médicos del Mundo, APFEM, Red Cross, Madre Coraje, Messengers of Peace Granada, Titiritas Clown, Vicente Ferrer Foundation, Down Syndrome Association, among others.

== Associations ==
The Monaco Group belongs to the Spanish Association of Electronic Commerce, which brings together businesses and organizations invested in the development of E–commerce and the defense of their interests.

== Television and advertising ==
Their products have been sold and distributed through television, Internet, and malls. The company is recognized through its continued presence in TV programs and sponsors such as:

- Constantino Romero: for 14 years he has participated in several campaigns for the company, providing his image and voice.
- Mariona Xuclá: an actress who has worked for the brand since 2003 as an advertising image.

== Gallery ==
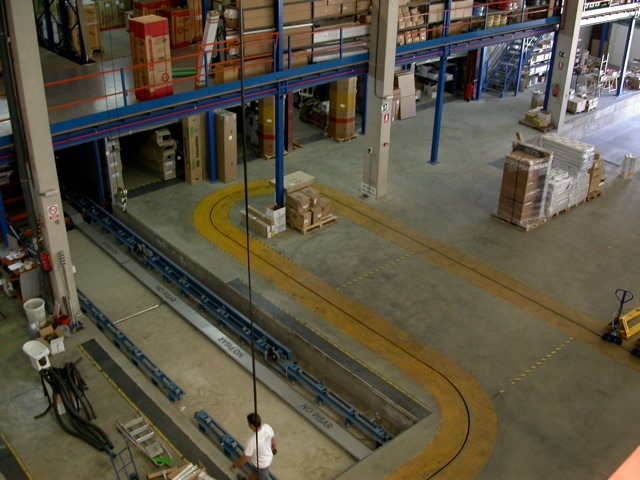
Grupo Lo Monaco silo(Granada)

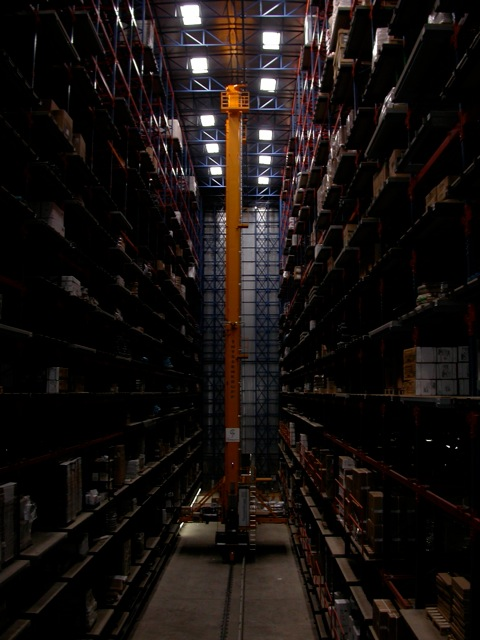
Grupo Lo Monaco warehouse management

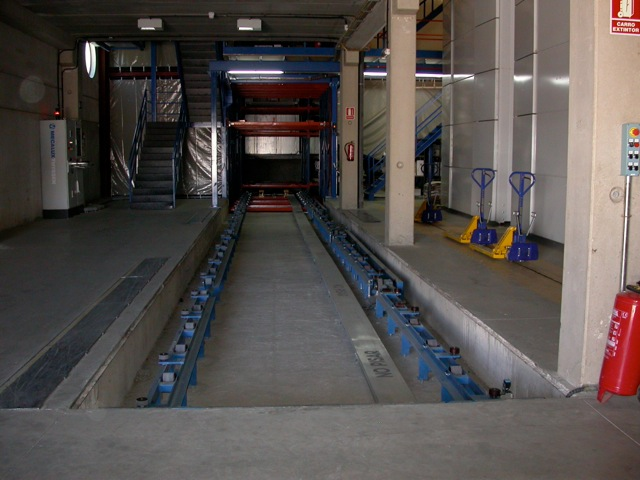
Grupo Lo Monaco warehouse
