= Aquarius Dignitus =

Search and rescue vessel

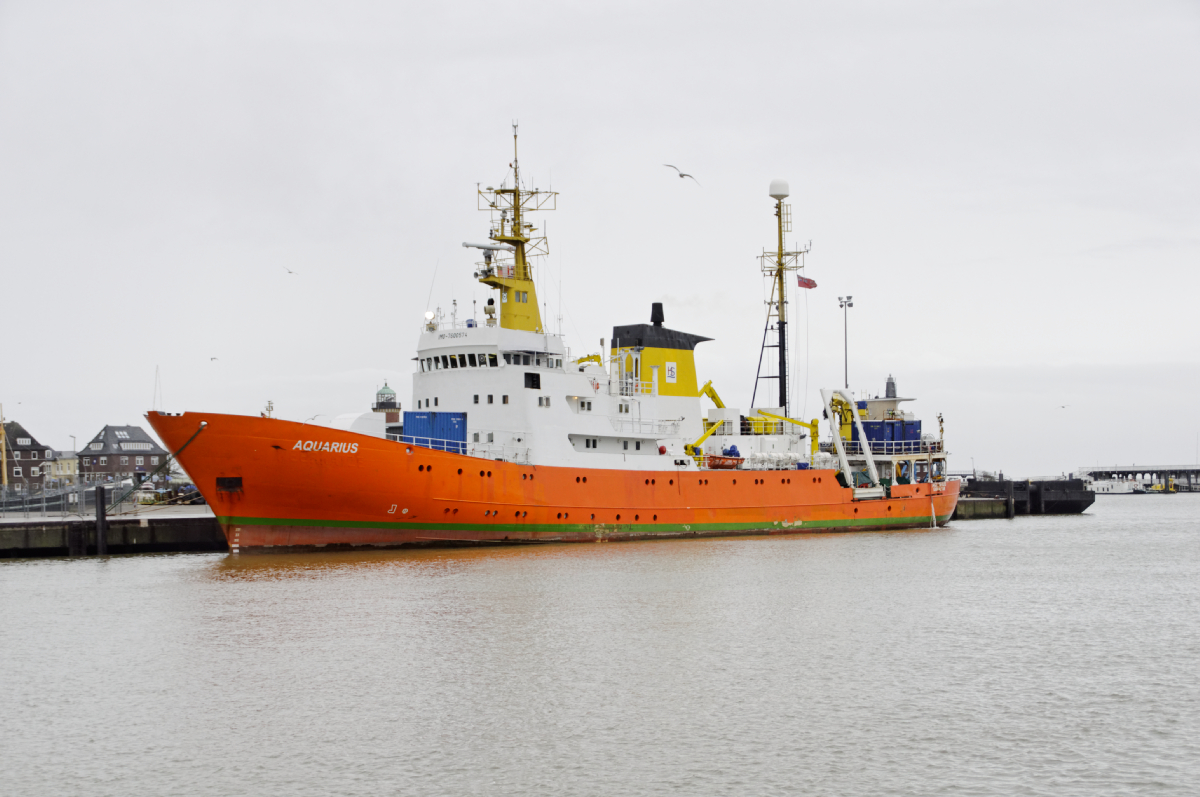
- Aquarius in 2012

History

Germany
- Name: Meerkatze
- Operator: German Coast Guard
- Ordered: 30 December 1975
- Builder: Lürssen, Bremen, Germany
- Launched: 19 November 1976
- Commissioned: 9 December 1977
- Fate: Transferred to NGO SOS Méditerranée

Gibraltar
- Name: Aquarius
- Acquired: 1 May 2009

Panama
- Name: Aquarius 2
- Operator: NGO SOS Méditerranée
- Acquired: 1 September 2018
- Identification: IMO number: 7600574; MMSI number: 355856000; Callsign: 3FML5

Germany
- Name: Aquarius 2
- Operator: NGO SOS Méditerranée
- Acquired: 1 September 2018
- Identification: IMO number: 7600574; MMSI number: 355856000; Callsign: 3FML5

Liberia
- Name: Aquarius Dignitus
- Operator: Jasmund Shipping GmbH & Co. KG
- Acquired: 1 November 2018
- Identification: IMO number: 7600574; MMSI number: 636092838; Callsign: D5QK5

Russia
- Name: водолей (Aquarius)
- Acquired: December 2020
- Identification: IMO number: 7600574; MMSI number: 273296530; Callsign: UBVV6

General characteristics
- Tonnage: 1,812 GRT; 611 DWT
- Length: 252.6 ft (77.0 m)
- Beam: 38.5 ft (11.7 m)
- Draught: 19 ft (5.8 m)
- Installed power: Diesel-electric
- Propulsion: 2x Siemens AG Dynamowerk IP 4330-2 DM 04
- Speed: 15 knots

The MV Aquarius, formerly Aquarius Dignitus and Aquarius 2, is a 1977-built German Fisheries Authorities ship, used since 2020 as a Russian deep sea survey vessel. The ship was used to rescue refugees and migrants stranded in the Mediterranean Sea between 2016 and 2018. It was chartered and operated between February 2016 and late 2018 by the NGOs SOS Méditerranée and Médecins Sans Frontières (MSF or Doctors without borders) as a rescue vessel for migrants and refugees making the Mediterranean crossing in makeshift craft from Libya to Italy as part of the European migrant crisis.

The rescue vessel was converted from the German coast-guard and fishery protection vessel (then named Meerkatze, built in 1977). The rescue ship had a registered capacity to accommodate 25 crew members and carried up to 4 journalists and up to 300 rescued migrants. All of the refugees slept on the deck, as the vessel did not have beds, cabins or accommodation for refugees. In November 2018, The Guardian reported that her flag had been revoked by Panama and Liberia, and there was a search for a prospective flag to register under.

== History ==
Completed by Lürssen in Bremen in 1977, serial ID 13453, the ship was utilised by the German Federal Agency for Agriculture and Nutrition (BLE) unit of the Küstenwache, or the German Federal Coast Guard, as a "Fischereischutzboot" or fishery protection vessel.

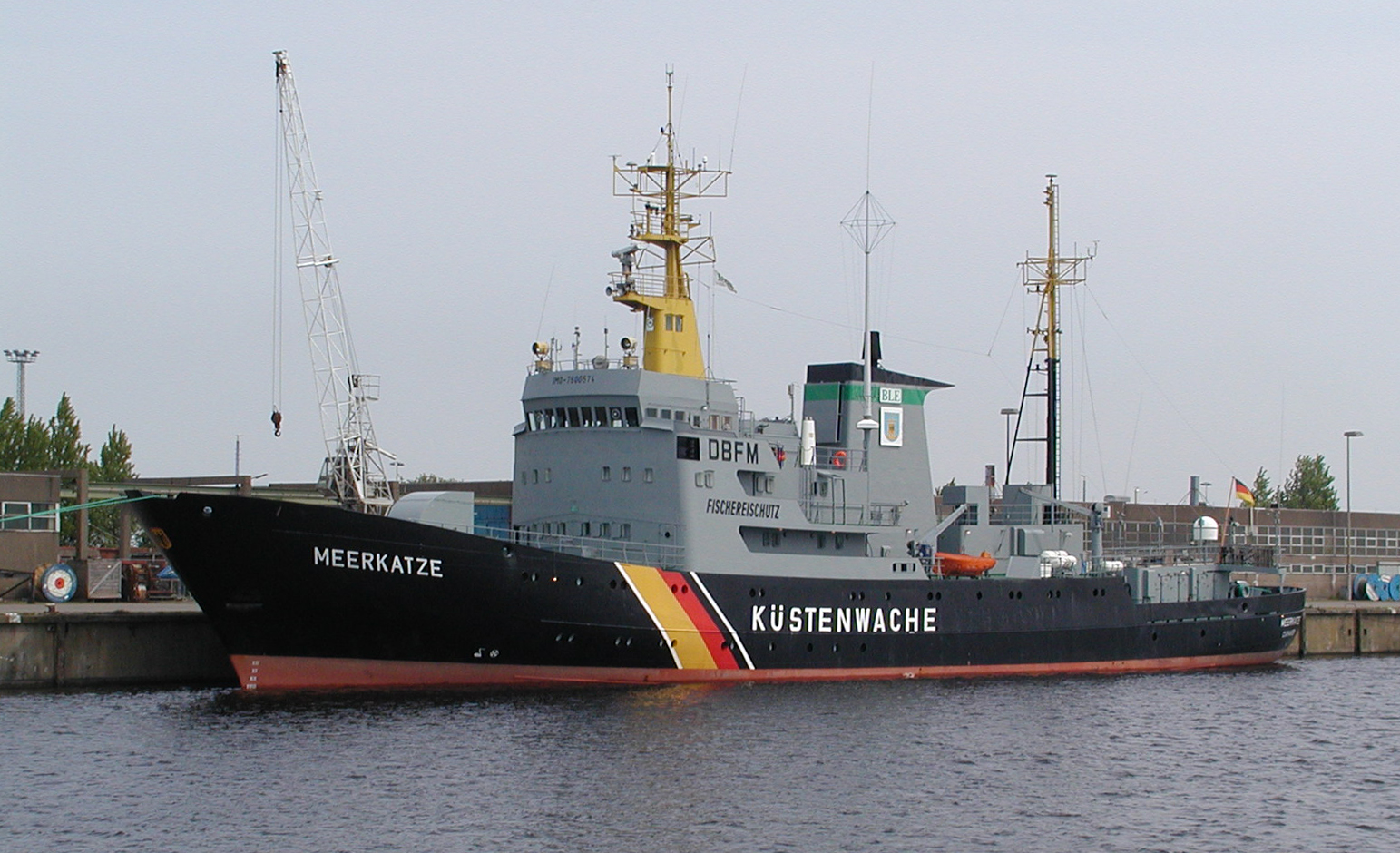
Meerkatze in German coast guard livery in 2006

The ship was classified by Germanischer Lloyd as a Class E2 icebreaker, employed principally in the central North Sea and North Atlantic, where thanks to its design it proved excellent at navigating through adverse sea conditions. In 2009 it was decommissioned and replaced by the Meerkatze II, previously the research ship Anton Dohrn. It was acquired by Bremen company RS Research Shipping (now Jasmund Shipping), renamed MV Aquarius and re-registered under Gibraltar port of registry. Here it operated until the end of 2015 as a survey vessel for renewable energy, oil & gas industry, and other offshore projects.

On 1 September 2018, the vessel's operators changed the ship's name from Aquarius to Aquarius 2 and changed its vessel type from "research vessel" to "search and rescue vessel".

The ship has been operated and managed by Jasmund shipping GmBH since June 2017, and after a brief interval again since 11 September 2018. Prior to this, the ship was managed by Hempel shipping (2009–2017). The ship has been owned by Aquarius GmBH & Co KG since April 2009. On 16 August 2018, the ship was inspected by the Port state control (Pais MoU) at Valletta (Malta) and five deficiencies were found related to the crew certificates, oil record book and blocked routes of escape.

=== Operations in Mediterranean Sea ===
In February 2016 the ship was chartered by humanitarian NGO SOS Méditerranée, to provide open sea rescue and support to migrants crossing the Mediterranean Sea to reach the European Union. Operating on missions coordinated by Rome's maritime rescue coordination centre, patrolling the waters around Sicily, Lampedusa, and near the Libyan coast, it provided aid to over 10,000 migrants. On 25 May 2016 the Aquarius returned from its tenth rescue operation, having saved 388 migrants. A Ghanaian boy was born on board who was subsequently named Alex in honor of the Russian captain of the Aquarius, Alexander Moroz.

In June 2018 the ship, carrying 629 migrants from Sudan and Bangladesh saved from the sea, was denied entry to Italy by its new Interior Minister Matteo Salvini and to Malta as well. The Government of Spain offered the ship the chance to dock in the port of Valencia, Spain, and the Italian Navy offered full assistance and a marine escort for the trip. Aquarius and its migrants arrived at the Port of Valencia on 17 June. Half of them opted to claim asylum in France, insofar as France opened the doors to anyone from the Aquarius. In August 2018, Spain refused entry to the vessel carrying 141 migrants from Eritrea and Somalia as Spain is not the closest safe port, as stipulated by international law. They were distributed among France, Germany, Luxembourg, Portugal and Spain.

On 20 September 2018 the Aquarius picked up ten Pakistanis and a person from the Ivory Coast from a dinghy 28 nautical miles (52 km; 32 mi) from the Libyan coast and 120 miles (190 km) from the closest European shore, the Italian island Lampedusa. The same day the Aquarius asked Italy and Malta permission to disembark the eleven migrants and both countries refused. The migrants were handed over to a coastguard vessel off Malta on 29 September 2018, after European governments had agreed to take the people in. The Aquarius 2 returned to Marseille. In the autumn of 2018, the ship was repeatedly denied entry by Italy was instead forced to land in Malta and Spain. Italy had seen more than 700,000 migrants arrive on its shores in the 2013–2018 period. In December 2018, MSF and SOS Méditerranée announced that they had ceased their operations with the ship due repeated accusations of trafficking in waste and criminal activity, but affirmed their determination to "resume our activities".

After this time the SOS Méditerranée continued their work with the Ocean Viking.

=== Russian Navy Service ===
In December 2020 businessman Alexey S. acquired the ship for Euro 2,3 Million from a shipyard in Bremen using a company named "Mostrello", located in Cyprus. He stated to use the ship for a survey mission with a Russian mining operation and started to acquire additional state of the art underwater equipment in various Western nations. Press research later revealed, that the actual buyer was the Russian Navy, who bought the technology to set up the "Harmony Network", a sophisticated underwater surveillance system in the Arctic Ocean, allegedly connecting Murmansk,Novaya Zemlya and Alexandra Land. The supply with western technology using "Mostrello" was disrupted after the 2022 Russian invasion of Ukraine with Western sanctions, but Russia managed to secure several imports over the Cyprus connection well after the invasion.

== Flag dispute ==
The vessel was flagged under the flag of convenience Gibraltar since February 2018. She was registered as a research and survey vessel, which subsequently led to administrative issues. On 6 August 2018 the Gibraltar Maritime Administration issued a "notice of removal" for the Aquarius, because she was registered as a survey vessel, but used as a rescue ship. As a result, the ship was warned that she would be removed from Gibraltar registry. Thence, the ship's operators approached other flags in order to register the ship under them. On 10 August 2018, they applied to register the ship with a Vatican-State flag, but this was denied by Vatican. On 27 August 2018 the ship arrived in Marseille and its operator MSF announced that the owner had applied for a registration of the vessel in the flag of convenience Panama on 20 August. However, on 22 September 2018 the maritime authority of Panama announced that it had initiated procedures to remove the Aquarius from its registry, quoting violations of international law with respect to migrants, rescue at sea and refusing to carry the migrants back to the area where they originated (UNCLOS, SOLAS and SAR convention). The Government of Panama initiated the process based on information received from Italy that the Aquarius had not followed international regulations and legal proceedings concerning the transport of migrants. Aquarius was specifically accused of not returning the rescued migrants to Libya as required by the SAR convention.

In September 2018, the vessel continued to be classed with Germanischer Lloyd and registered with Gibraltar flag as a research / survey vessel. This led to issues with authorities, as a research and survey vessel cannot operate as a passenger vessel unless it reflects these changes in its registry documents. After the ship returned to Marseille in early October 2018 the owner issued a statement about negotiating to obtain a new flag from Switzerland, Luxembourg or Venezuela. As per Equasis and IHS maritime, on 1 September 2018, the ship changed its name to Aquarius 2 and changed its flag to Germany. As per Equasis and IHS maritime, on 1 November 2018, the ship changed its name to Aquarius Dignitus and changed its flag to Liberia.
