= Proactiva Open Arms =

Spanish search and rescue organization

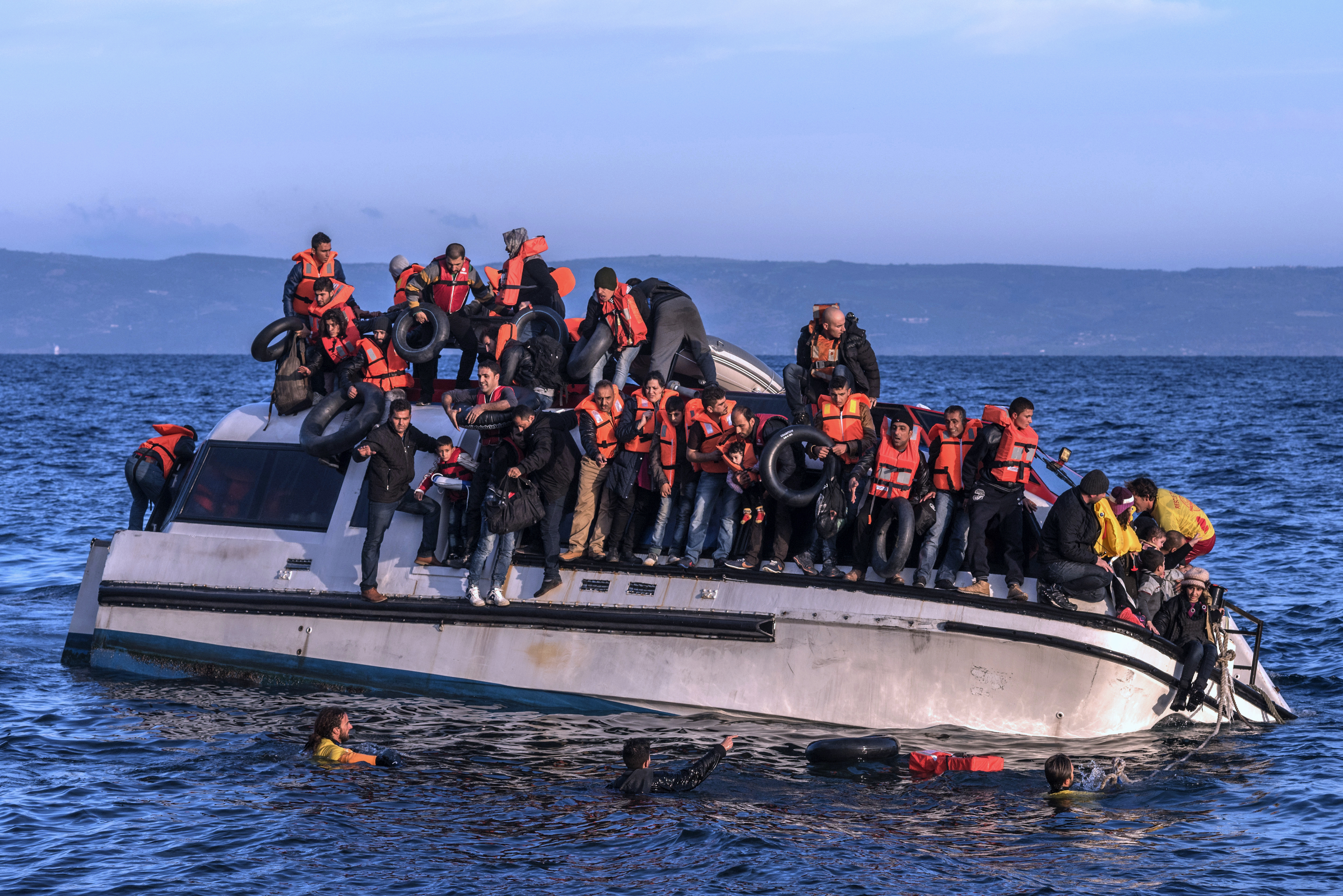
- Volunteer lifeguards (with yellow-red clothes) from Proactiva Open Arms helping Syrian and Iraqi refugees (Lesbos, October 2015).
- Named after: Proactiva Serveis Aquàtics
- Founder: Òscar Camps
- Founded at: Badalona (Catalonia, Spain)
- Type: Private non profit foundation
- Purpose: Search and rescue (SAR)
- Location: Lesbos, Greece
- Region served: Mediterranean
- Services: Sea rescue lifeguards
- Website: www.proactivaopenarms.org

Proactiva Open Arms (POA) is a Spanish NGO devoted to search and rescue (SAR) at sea. Set up in October 2015, it carried out its first rescue action that same month from its base on the Greek island of Lesbos. As well as maintaining a permanent base on Lesbos, the NGO carries out its rescue operations from three ships, a sailing yacht Astral, the Golfo Azzurro and Open Arms.

In 2016, Proactiva won the H.E.R.O. Award for Outstanding Team Contribution to a Maritime SAR Operation at the first edition of the UK-based International Maritime Rescue Federation's (IMRF) H.E.R.O. (Honouring Excellence in Rescue Operations) Awards for their participation in saving the lives of over 200 people who had capsized their overloaded vessel off the north shore of Lesbos.

The NGO has received several other awards, including the European Citizen's Prize awarded by the European Parliament in 2016. Its founder, Òscar Camps, was named Catalan of the Year by El Periódico de Catalunya in 2015. In October 2021, film director Marcel Barrena released a film, Mediterraneo: The Law of the Sea, devoted to the story of Òscar Camps and his colleagues which is very close to be a documentary.

== Origins ==
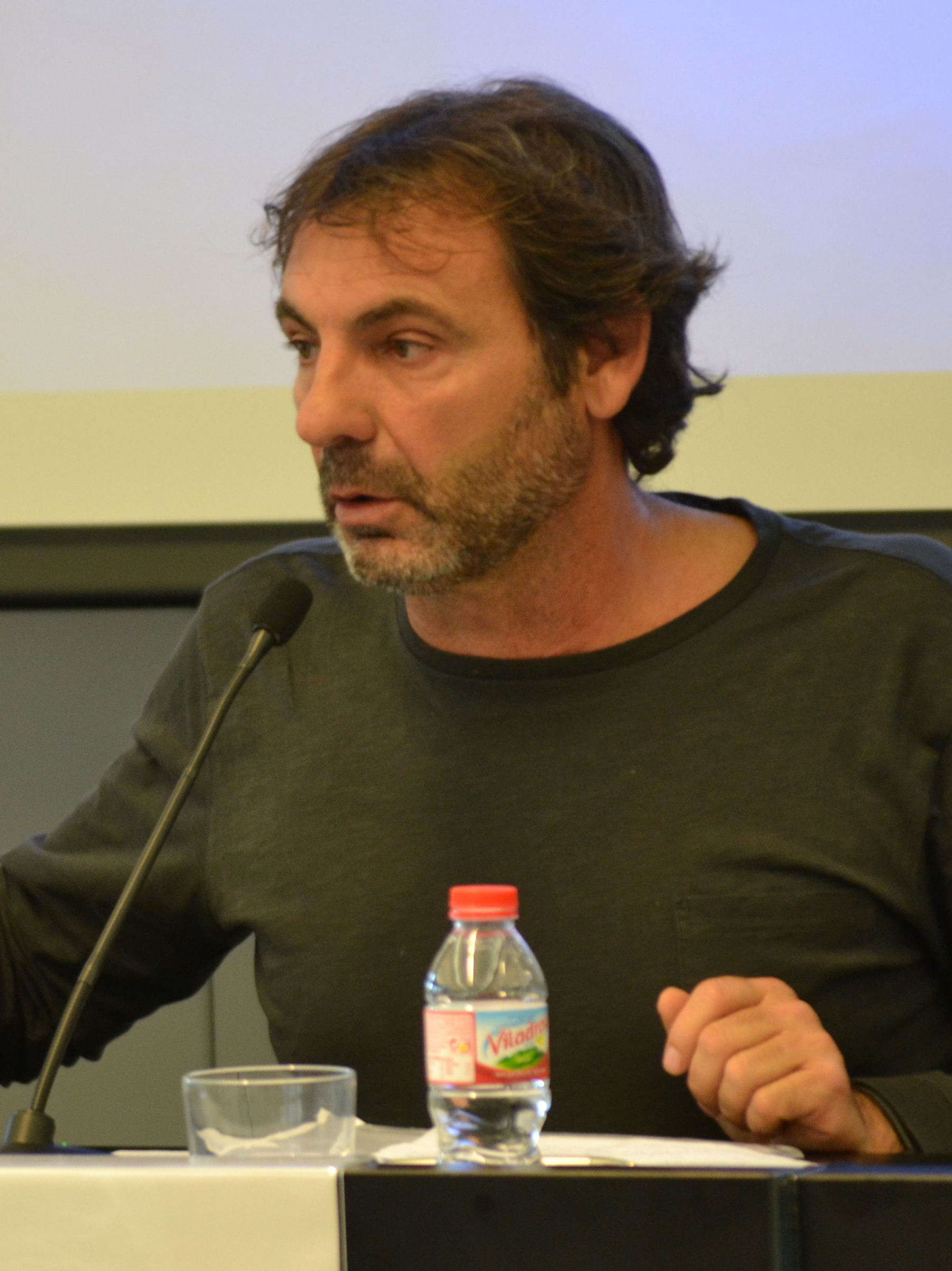
Òscar Camps, Proactiva Open Arms founder, in 2017.

As an NGO, Proactiva developed from Pro-Activa Serveis Aquàtics, a company providing lifeguard and water rescue services, located in Badalona, Spain. Due to the refugee crisis and the several high-profile deaths at sea, Oscar Camps travelled to Lesbos in September 2015, along with three other volunteers.

== Lesbos ==
In September the first volunteers arrived on the Greek island to collaborate in rescue operations. In the beginning, the only materials available to them was basic diving equipment. Their main activities were to guide and assist the migrants to arrive safely on the shore.

- 28 October 2015: Alongside Greek coastguards, local fishermen and Frontex, the first six lifeguards deployed by Proactiva on Lesbos participated, with two jetskis, in the rescue of 242 survivors of a capsized boat. 60 people lost their lives in the tragedy.

== Mediterranean search-and-rescue zone ==
In July 2017, Proactiva Open Arms was one of the three migrant rescue NGOs operating in the area that signed the Italian government’s code of conduct for rescue operations. Five other NGOs refused. Apart from the organisations refusing to sign the code, Amnesty International commented that the code of conduct "is the result of a wrong belief that having rescuers attracts migration"; that it "is specifically designed to hinder the work of humanitarian ships" and "has no legal value whatsoever", as it conflicts with international law regarding rescue operations (Gianfranco Schiavone, Italian Association for Legal Studies on Immigration, ASGI); and that application of the code could carry "serious consequences" for rescuers because it could expose them to accusations of aiding illegal immigration and that it was "a trick to make NGOs more vulnerable to future legal actions" (Fulvio Vassallo Paleologo, University of Palermo).

Previously, experts on migration policy had commented that EU politicians and policy makers have repeatedly declared they are ‘at war’ with the smugglers and that they intend to ‘break the smugglers business model’. "The evidence from our research suggests that smuggling is driven, rather than broken, by EU policy" (Dr Franck Duvell, Centre on Migration Policy and Society at the University of Oxford), and that "The problem is there’s a huge political agenda around migration, so the more pragmatic of effective alternatives are being overridden by political aspirations of leaders across the European Union. They’ve backed themselves into a political corner where it’s very difficult to do anything else" (Professor Heaven Crawley, Coventry University's Centre for Trust, Peace and Social Relations). At the end of 2016 Human Rights Watch stated that "A lack of leadership, vision, and solidarity based on human rights principles are at the core of the EU’s dismal response to refugee and migration challenges".

Likewise, a December 2016 report by Médecins Sans Frontières (MSF) analysing the EU's accusations, based on an internal report from the European border agency, Frontex, that the humanitarian organisations running search and rescue operations in the Central Mediterranean were doing so in collusion with smugglers or were helping them to carry out their deadly trade, concluded that "... the alternative implied by Frontex’s concerns about our rescue operations is to let people drown as a strategy to deter the smugglers".

Also responding to Frontex's allegations that aid groups were indirectly supporting criminal traffickers, Mario Giro, Italy's deputy foreign minister, said it showed a fundamental misunderstanding of so-called "push" and "pull" factors, adding that it was "a misleading controversy being used for internal purposes".

The view that the rescue NGOs' boats in the Mediterranean acted as a "pull factor" for migrants and traffickers was also challenged in March 2017 by two academics from Oxford and UC Berkeley who looked at data on rescues and deaths at sea and concluded that there was no correlation between the number of rescue vessels near Libya and the number of migrants arriving in Italy, stating that "SAR (search and rescue) operations reduce mortality risks (or conversely, the absence of SAR operations leads to more deaths), and has little or no effect on the number of arrivals".

On the other hand, researchers also cite testimonies of smugglers bribing police in Greece, Turkey and other countries of transit and that state officials, the military, law enforcement, and border guards are also involved in smuggling.

=== 2016 ===
4 October: members of the POA aboard the sailing yacht Astral participated in the rescue of hundreds of people on overloaded wooden vessels and rafts and recovered dozens of corpses –with over two dozen people found dead in one boat alone–.

=== 2017 ===
- 2 January 2017: the POA rescued 112 migrants
- 24 March 2017: POA lifeguards recovered five corpses from two capsized boats, each of which could hold in overload mode more than 100 people.
- 14 April 2017: The Italian coastguard service confirmed that 2,074 migrants on 16 rubber dinghies and three small wooden boats had been saved that day in 19 rescue operations by coastguards or NGOs. One person was found dead and ninety-seven people are missing, presumed drowned.
- 6 August 2017: Members of the POA operating on the Golfo Azzurro rescued three people in international waters 100 miles from the Libyan coast in an operation co-ordinated by the Italian coastguard. Reuters reported 48 hours later the ship had still not received authorisation to disembark anywhere, after having been refused permission to dock in Lampedusa, the nearest port to where the rescue took place. The ship's captain, Adrian Sonneveld, stated that all the instructions concerning the rescue had come from the coast guard control centre in Rome. He added that as the closest port was Lampedusa, "By international maritime law, it is illegal to refuse the Golfo Azzurro entry to this port".
- 15 August 2017: the Libyan coastguard service threatened the mariners on board the Golfo Azzurro in the search-and-rescue (SAR) zone of international waters. Three charities —Save the Children, MSF and Sea Eye— had already suspended their rescue work due to such threats, leaving only the POA, SOS Méditerranée and Moas carrying out SAR operations in the area. Commenting on the incident to the Italian state broadcaster, RAI, senator Luigi Manconi stated: "Life for NGOs is becoming dangerous. There is a strategy of dissuasion and intimidation, and strong pressure by the Libyans in order for (NGOs) to stop operating at sea". That same day, a speedboat operated by anti-immigration activists Defend Europe approached one of Proactive's RHIBs to place stickers on the side. Defend Europe's action came shortly after POA founder Oscar Camps had accused the anti-immigration activists of falsifying data, posting images of false boat positions, and making "threats by radio". He also stated that "our AIS signal has been hacked to show we're in Libyan waters, but we're not". The Italian magazine Famiglia Cristiana later confirmed Camps' statement after it had verified the AIS signal, that includes the boat's GPS location, with MarineTraffic, the digital hub that collects and publishes navigation data.

=== 2018 ===
- 27 January 2018: the POA, in a co-ordinated rescue operation with the Spanish Navy frigate Santa María, rescued 329 people, including 95 women, three of them pregnant, and 37 children, six of whom were newborns.
- 11 March 2018: the POA rescued three brothers who had fled Libya in a rubber dinghy, one of them a 13-year-old boy suffering from leukemia and with an IV line attached to his body.
- 12 March 2018: the POA rescued 93 migrants, disembarking in Pozzallo, Sicily.

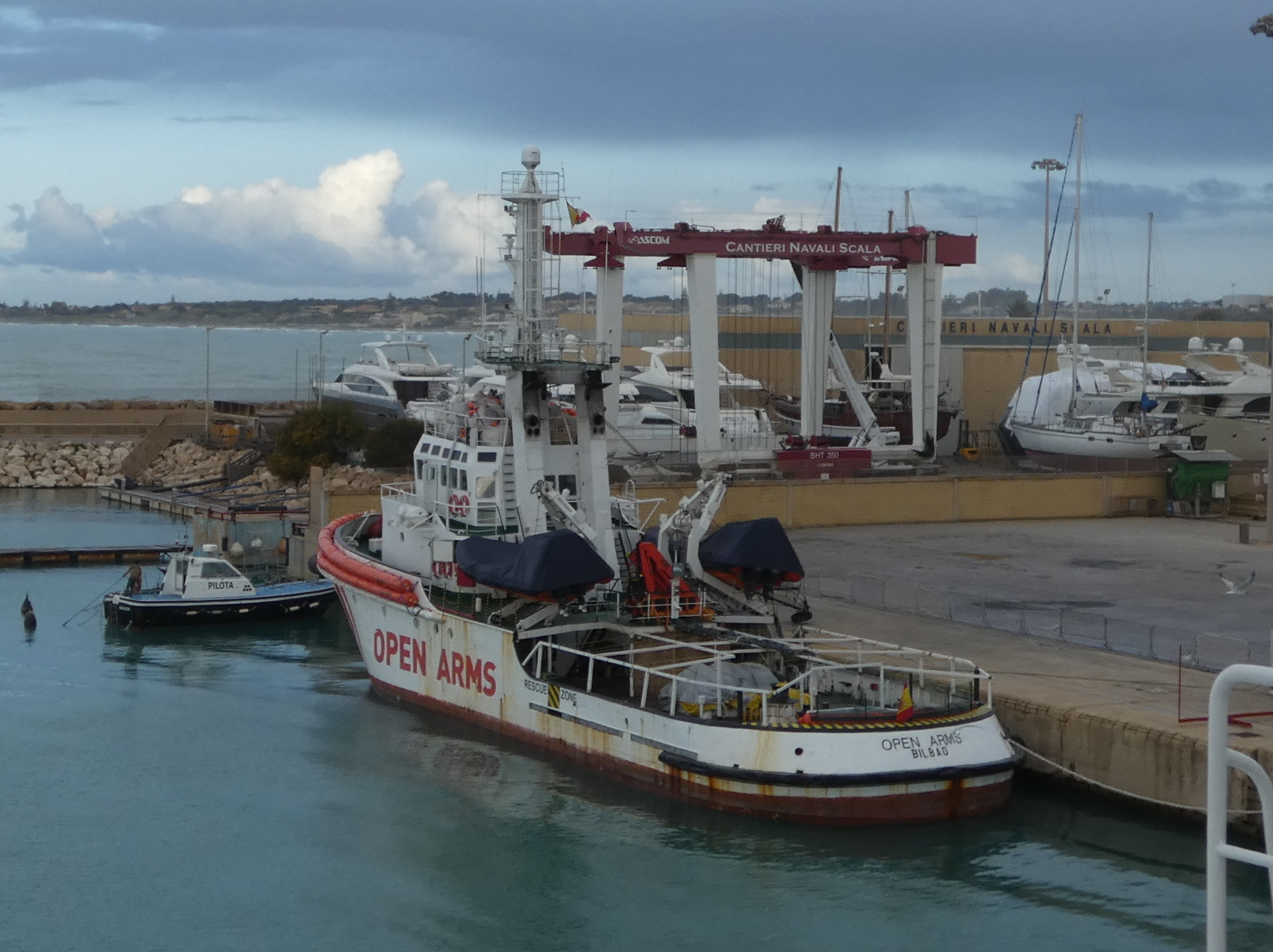
Open Arms in Pozzallo 26.3.2018 after confiscation

- 16 March 2018: a Libyan coastguard vessel intercepted the Open Arms in international waters and threatened to "shoot to kill" unless the lifeguards handed over the women and children on board who were among the 218 people rescued earlier that day by the POA in international waters. Open Arms had attended an alert sent out by the Italian coastguard's Italian Maritime Rescue Coordination Center (IMRCC) to rescue two overloaded boats in difficulty. After the POA had reached the boat carrying the migrants, IMRCC informed them that Libya forces had command over the operation, but "told the Open Arms crew to use their judgment". A Libyan coastguard patrol boat reached the scene approximately 30 minutes after all the migrants had been issued with life jackets and all the women and children had been transferred to the POA's RHIBs. Two days later, The Associated Press, quoting the Italian news agency Agenzia Nazionale Stampa Associata (ANSA), reported that the ship had been impounded by Italian authorities and its captain and two other people were being investigated for human trafficking after arriving in Pozzallo, Sicily with 216 of the 218 migrants they had rescued in international waters, 73 miles (117 kilometers) from the coast of Libya. Two of the people rescued, a mother and her sick child, had been evacuated to Malta, where the ship is based, before Italian authorities permitted the ship to proceed to Sicily "given the precarious conditions of the migrants and worsening weather forecasts".
- 16 April 2018: The Italian court orders the release of the vessel Open Arms, nevertheless the human trafficking investigations continue.

==== Reactions to impoundment by Italian authorities ====
Following the impoundment of the rescue ship on arrival at Pozzallo, major international humanitarian NGOs issued statements criticising the action of the Italian authorities.

- AI referred to the incident as "reckless disregard for common decency". The statement added that "It is time for European governments to urgently reset their cooperation with Libya on migration. Their callous complicity with smugglers, criminals and torturers must end and the safety and the rights of refugees, asylum-seekers and migrants must be prioritized".
- HRW, reporting on the incident, stated that "Proactiva acted to save migrants’ lives and then prevented them from being abused in indefinite detention. It is perverse to try to characterize as criminal a refusal to hand victims to Libyan coast guard forces knowing they could face possible torture and rape in Libyan detention centers". The report went on to explain that "international human rights and refugee law prohibits returning anyone to a place where they face a real risk of torture or ill-treatment –the non-refoulement principle. Empowering Libyan forces to capture people on the high seas, when it is known that they will return them to cruel, inhuman, or degrading treatment in arbitrary detention exposes Italy and other EU states involved to charges of aiding and abetting in serious human rights violations in detention".
- MSF criticised the "criminalisation" of the NGOs that rescue migrants at sea, pointing out that "under no circumstances" should the people rescued be returned to Libya, and referring to the impoundment of Proactiva's ship as "the latest in a series of actions against NGOs that carry out life-saving rescue operations".
- Vincent Cochetel, United Nations High Commissioner for Refugees's (UNHCR) special envoy for the central Mediterranean, stated that he hoped this incident was not a return of what he called "the campaign we saw in 2017 against NGOs involved in rescue-at-sea".
- Referring to the Code of Conduct for NGOs, Senator Luigi Manconi noted that "the code has no legal force. It is a treaty agreement between the Ministry and an individual. I do not find that a violation occurred, and if it did, it certainly would not constitute a crime." He went on to add that, "information to the flag state qualifies more as a commitment, while saving those in danger is an obligation. The hierarchy is very clear."

=== 2020 ===
On 8 and 9 September 2020 the crew of Open Arms picked up three groups of 77, 116 and 83 migrants. The ship anchored a few hundred meters off Palermo harbor with some 278 migrants on board and waited for permission to dock. After a week of waiting, on 17 September 2020, 75 migrants jumped overboard and tried to swim to the shore. The 75 were finally picked up by the Italian coast guard, while 188 remained on the Open Arms. The scene repeated the next day, now with 48 migrants trying to make it ashore. They were also picked up to be later transferred to the MS GNV Allegra for COVID-19 quarantine.

=== 2021 ===
In February 2021, the POA rescued over 100 migrants off the coast of Libya.

== Vessels ==
In July 2016, the NGO received the sailing yacht Astral, donated by Livio Lo Monaco. Designed by Philip Rhodes and built in 1970, the yacht featured in the documentary recorded on board that same month by Jordi Évole for Salvados, directed by Évoli for Atresmedia Televisión. The box office takings from the documentary, shown at cinemas throughout Catalunya before being broadcast on TV, were earmarked in their entirety for the NGO.

At the end of 2016, Astral was substituted by Golfo Azzurro, a fishing trawler 43 metres in length and 8 metres beam. Based in Malta, this vessel covered the NGO's rescue operations in the central Mediterranean region and in international waters off the northern coast of Libya.

In mid-2017, the POA commissioned Open Arms, an emergency tow vessel (37 metres in length) which had previously seen service with Spain's maritime safety agency Salvamento Marítimo and was donated to the NGO by the Spanish shipping agency Grupo Ibaizabal.

In August 2017 POA vessels were barred by Italy and Malta from disembarking migrants. The POA also came in close contact with the Libyan coastguard who fired warning shots over one of its boats.

In June 2020 Astral returned to POA activity in the Mediterranean. In June 2025 the vessel rescued 54 people from an abandoned oil-rig.

From May 2022 until August 2023, POA operated the ship Open Arms Uno, under the Spanish flag, on loan from the Argentinian philanthropist Enrique Piñeyro.

== Awards ==
- H.E.R.O. Award for Outstanding Team Contribution to a Maritime SAR Operation at the first edition of the UK-based International Maritime Rescue Federation’s (IMRF) H.E.R.O. (Honouring Excellence in Rescue Operations) Awards for their participation in saving the lives of over 200 people.
- the Pere Casàldiga Award in 2016
- European Citizen's Prize
- Premio UNICEF 2017 Comité Español Transforma

== See also ==
- Hellenic Rescue Team
- Iuventa
- Mediterranea Saving Humans
- Migrant Offshore Aid Station
- No Border network
- SOS Méditerranée
