= SOS Méditerranée =

European NGO for the rescue of life at sea

SOS Méditerranée is a European, maritime-humanitarian organisation for the rescue of life at sea, currently operating in the Mediterranean sea in international waters north of Libya.

== Background ==
The organization chartered the Aquarius and more recently the Ocean Viking in order to rescue people fleeing by sea from Libya and who risk drowning. The group was founded in June 2015 by German former captain Klaus Vogel and Frenchwoman Sophie Beau after the Italian navy ended the rescue Operation Mare Nostrum in 2014. Its headquarters are in Marseille (France), Milan (Italy), Frankfurt (Germany), Geneva (Switzerland).

In 2023, SOS Méditerranée was named as one of three laureates of the Right Livelihood Award, for "its life-saving humanitarian search and rescue operations in the Mediterranean Sea".

== European migration ==
The organization is best known for its actions during the European migrant crisis of rescuing migrants from sinking vessels in international waters north of Libya and providing the survivors with medical care and shelter, before being disembarked in a place of safety mostly in European ports in Italy and Malta. Since the start of the rescue operation in 2015, the Aquarius has saved more than 29,000 lives. They are considered a "taxi service for migrants" by Italian Minister of the Interior, deputy prime minister and leader of the far-right anti-migration party La Lega Matteo Salvini and have been denied entry to Italy and Malta. They work in partnership with Doctors Without Borders. SOS Méditerranée clashed with Libyan coastguards during 2017 but continues to operate in the Libyan search and rescue region in international waters north of Libya.

== Network ==
SOS Méditerranée works as a European association with teams in Germany, France, Italy and Switzerland forming a European network, jointly financing and operating the rescue ship Aquarius, which has been in continuous operation since February 2016 in international waters between Italy and Libya.

The medical care was provided by Doctors without Borders from May 2016 to 2020. From July 2021 it has been provided by the International Federation of Red Cross and Red Crescent Societies (IFRC).

== The Aquarius ==
It is a robust and seaworthy ship that offers wide spaces below deck, making it very suitable for year-round use as a rescue ship in the Mediterranean. Until 2009 the Aquarius was operated as a fishery protection vessel.

- Size: Length 77 m, Width 11.8 m, Draught 5.6 m
- Crew: Nautical and Technical Crew of 10 + Search and Rescue and Medical Crew
- Rescue capacity: 200 – 550 people
- Costs per day: 11.000 €

SOS Méditerranée used the Aquarius from February 2016 to October 2018. After this time operations have continued with the Ocean Viking.

== Ocean Viking ==
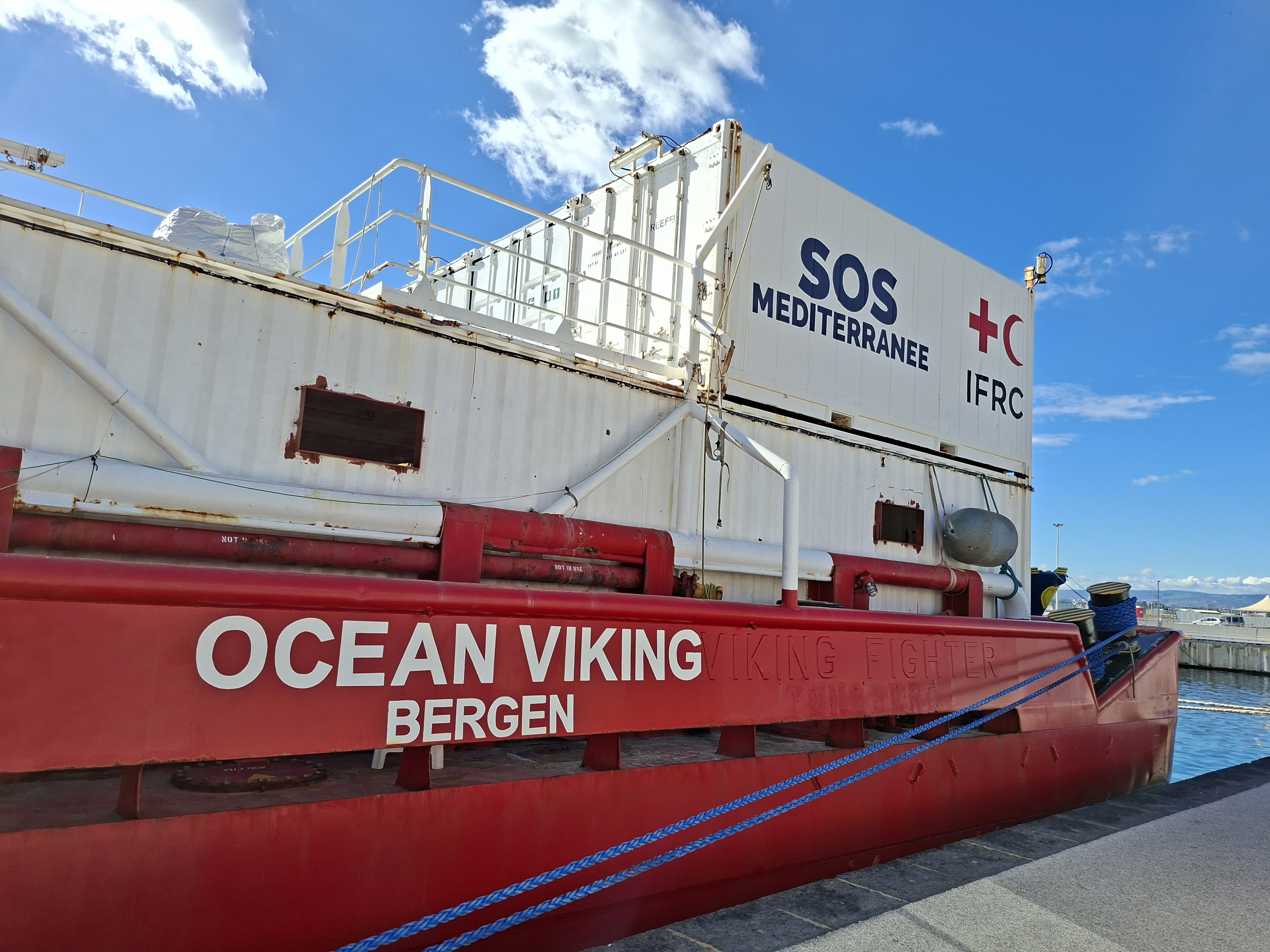

On 21 July 2019 SOS Méditerranée announced a new rescue campaign off the Libyan coast, using a cargo ship, the Ocean Viking. The approach is supported by the Norwegian authorities; the vessel is registered there. The operation cost €14,000 per day in 2019.

The 69 m long by 15 m wide vessel was built in 1986 to serve as a support vessel for oil rigs in the North Sea. She is operated by around thirty people (nine crew members, a search and rescue team and medical personnel) and can carry up to 200 survivors. Ocean Viking is faster and better equipped than the Aquarius. Onboard microphones and cameras will make it possible to record everything that happens on board and around the boat, in order to prove, if necessary, that operations are carried out within a legal framework. The ship, which will respect the ban on disembarking migrants in Italian ports, is banned from refueling in Malta.

As of 2025, SOS Méditerranée continues its life-saving rescue operations using the Ocean Viking.

== Albatross Uno ==
Albatross Uno is an aircraft operated by SOS Méditerranée and the "Humanitarian Pilots Initiative" which is used to scout the Mediterranean sea for migrant vessels in distress and to document activities in the search area.

== Funding ==
SOS MEDITERRANEE is a non-profit association and is financed through private and public donations.

Its partner, Doctors Without Borders (MSF), contributed to the monthly costs for the Aquarius and staffed the medical team on board for four years; in 2020, two organizations formally separated, citing differences over the health crisis during Covid.

== See also ==
- List of migrant vessel incidents on the Mediterranean Sea
- List of ships for the rescue of refugees in the Mediterranean Sea
- Timeline of the European migrant crisis
- Mediterranean Sea refugee smuggling
- Hellenic Rescue Team
- Iuventa
- Mediterranea Saving Humans
- Migrant Offshore Aid Station
- No Border network
- Proactiva Open Arms
- Sea Watch
