= Sea Eye Lake =

Lake in Russia

Lake Mushyl, Morskoy Glaz
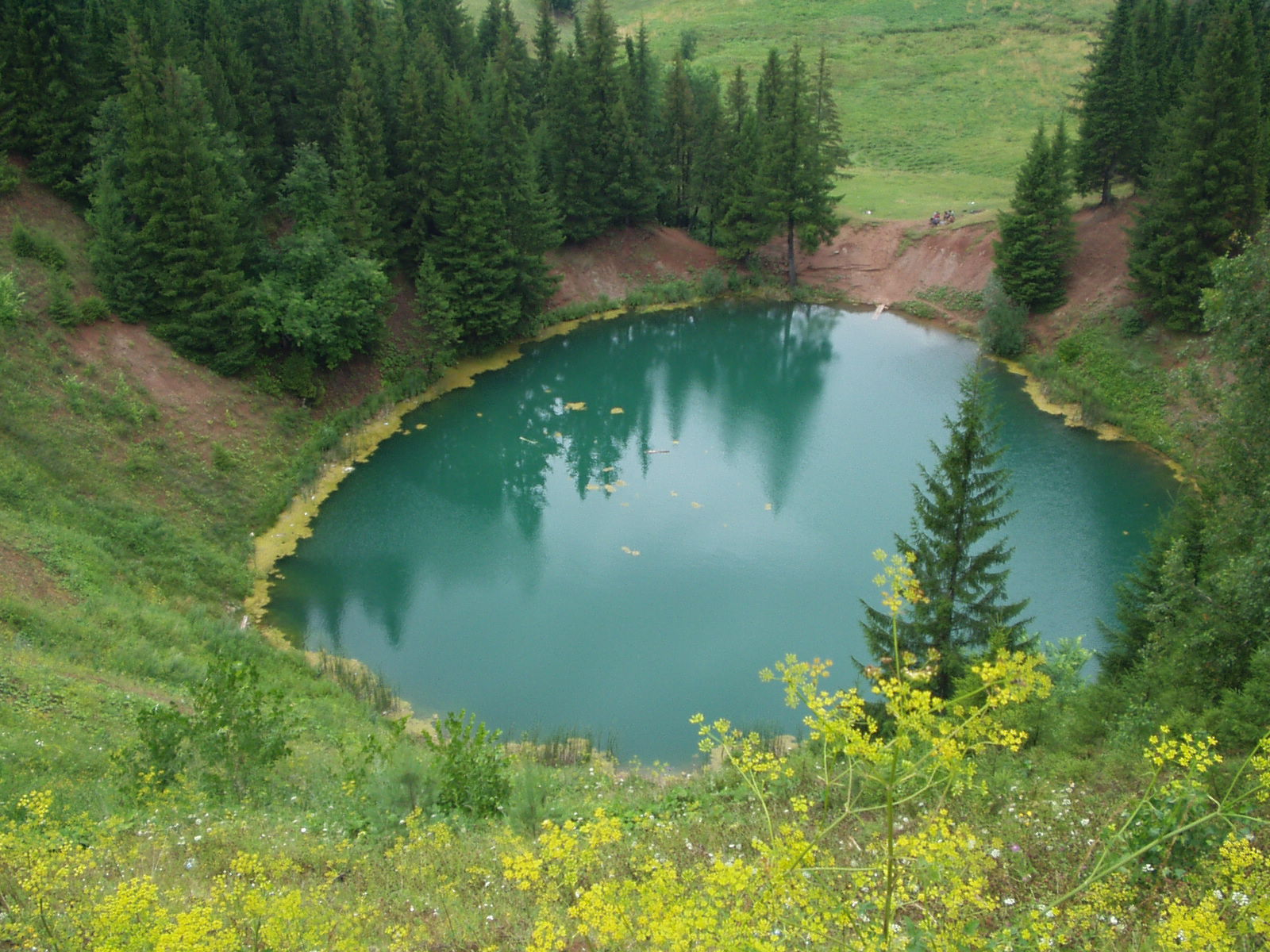
- Sea Eye from the top of nearby hill in 2004

- Location within Mari El
- Location: Mari El
- Coordinates: 56.16219°N 48.76024°E
- Type: Karst
- Basin countries: Russia
- Average depth: 37 m (121 ft)
- Max. depth: 38.5 m (126 ft)/42.4 m (139 ft)
- Water volume: shrinking
- Islands: no
- Settlements: Shariboksad

The Mushyl lake (Mari: Мӱшыл йер, Müšyl Jer), nicknamed the Sea Eye (Russian: Морской Глаз, Morskoy Glaz) is a minor karst lake in Shariboksad, Volzhsky District, Mari El, Russia. Located at the foot of the hill its bright green water is extremely deep (38.5 m) compared to the surface area (45x50 m).

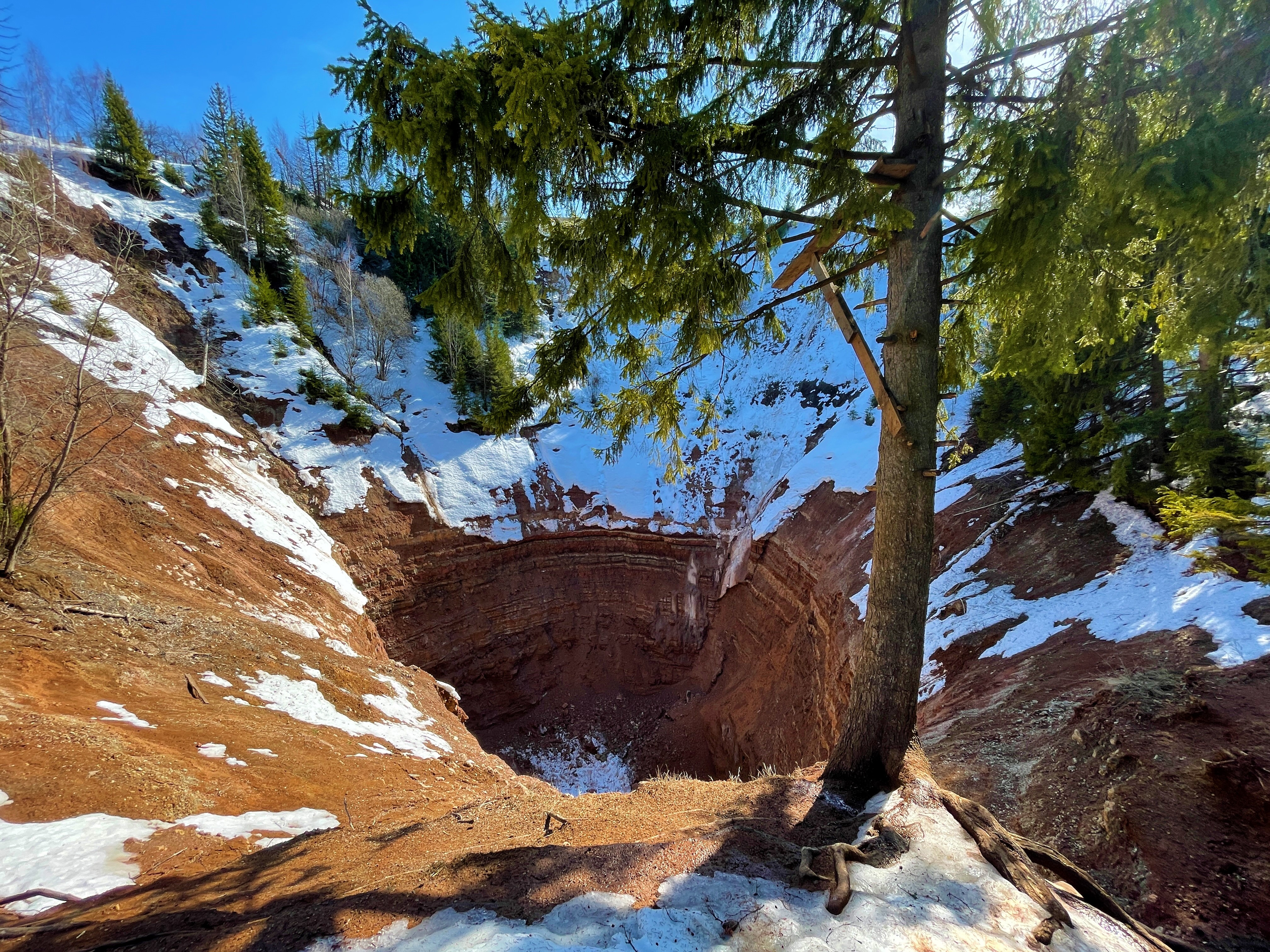
The dried lake in April 2022.

In 2022 the water level has dropped, leaving the lake nearly dried.

== Etymology ==
Müšyl ([myʃəl], Mari: Мӱшыл) means crater in the Mari language. In early documents it was known only by its Mari name, written in the Russian text with Mari diacritics. Later, Russian-speaking tourists were inspired by the sea-like colour of the water to give it the more poetic Russian name.

== Popular culture ==
According to Mari legend, a wedding procession fell into the Sea Eye and died when it suddenly appeared in an eruption.

The lake has become popular with tourists.
