= Mediterranean Sea migrant smuggling =

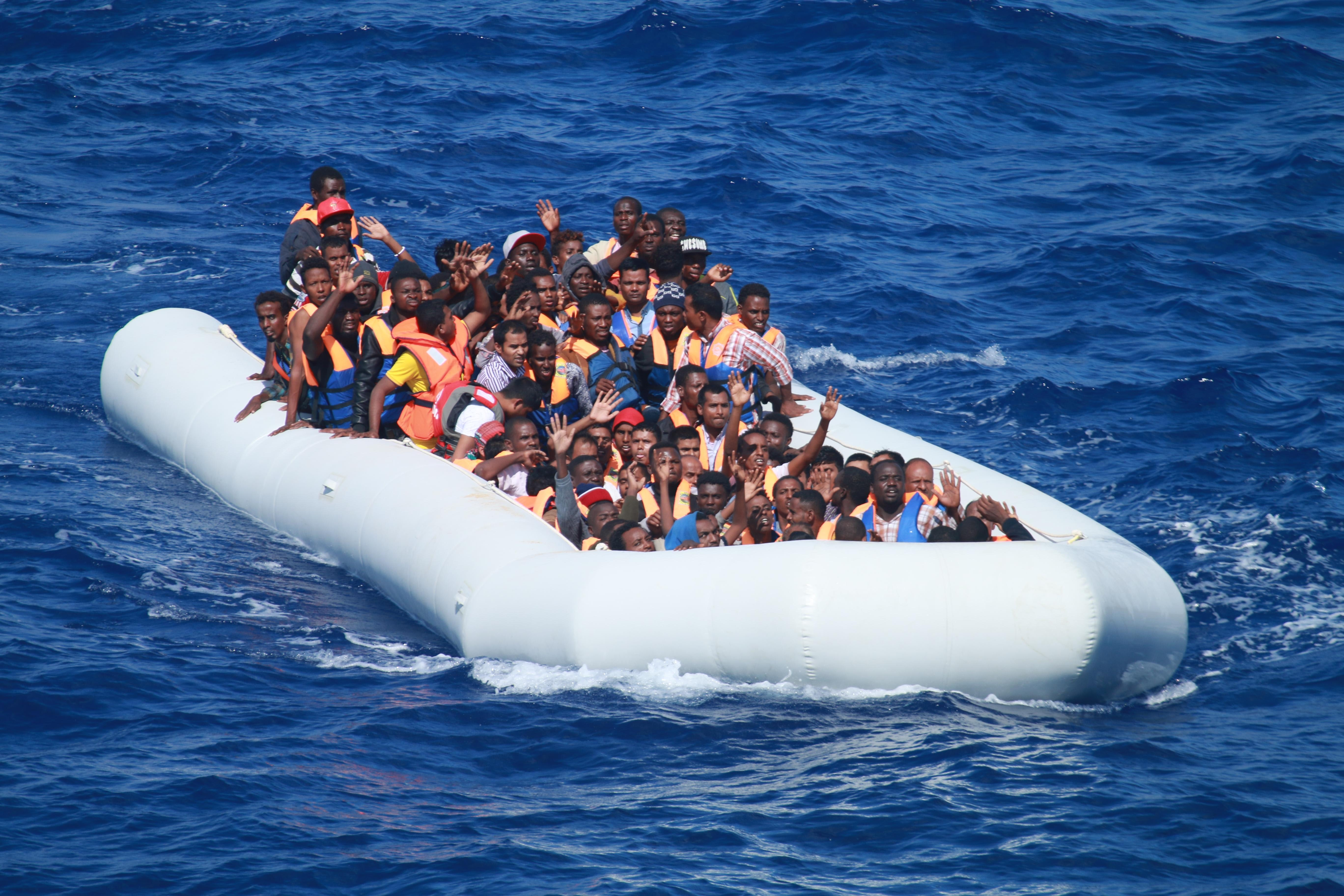
Migrants aboard an inflatable vessel in the Mediterranean in 2013

According to the United Nations, human smuggling is defined as "the procurement, in order to obtain, directly or indirectly, a financial or other material benefit, of the illegal entry of a person into a State Party of which the person is not a national or a permanent resident."

The terms "people smuggling" and "migrant smuggling" are often used interchangeably with "human smuggling", and follow the same definition provided by the United Nations.

Migrant smuggling and human trafficking are distinct offences. Smuggling involves facilitating a person's irregular entry into another country for financial or material benefit, whereas trafficking involves exploitation and can occur without crossing an international border. The two offences can overlap in practice.

Migrant smuggling is a blue crime, meaning a form of transnational organized crime at sea. More specifically, it represents a type of blue crime that involves criminal flows through the smuggling and maritime movement of people.

Irregular migration is not considered a blue crime, as it is not necessarily organized. However, when it involves migrant smuggling, it may fall under this category. Irregular migration across the Mediterranean Sea is often facilitated by smugglers, whose activities vary in terms of organization, scale, and methods. These can range from small groups of individuals to large transnational networks. Migrant smuggling is therefore closely linked to irregular migration, as smugglers provide means of transportation for individuals attempting to cross the Mediterranean Sea through often hazardous routes. The flow of migrant smuggling is therefore affected by the trends of irregular migration and refugees.

While flows of migration have come and gone throughout history, the current numbers surrounding human movement are unprecedented. Geographic, economic, and demographic factors create distinct migration patterns and routes over time. In 2020, there were 281 million international migrants across the globe, making up 3.6% of the global population. Though this is a small percentage of the total population, the number of individuals residing in states outside of where they were born has more than tripled since 1970.

The main sea routes across the Mediterranean to Europe are the Eastern Mediterranean route towards Greece and Cyprus, the Central Mediterranean route from North Africa towards Italy and Malta, and the Western Mediterranean route from North Africa towards Spain. European Union statistics also track the West African route to Spain's Canary Islands, but that route crosses the Atlantic Ocean rather than the Mediterranean Sea.

Since the 2015 migration crisis, the Central Mediterranean route has been declared the deadliest migration route in the world. More than 20,000 migrants died or went missing on the Mediterranean routes between 2014 and 2022. EU statistics sometimes combine the Western Mediterranean and West African routes under the label "Western routes". Because the West African route leads across the Atlantic to the Canary Islands, figures for the combined category include arrivals outside the Mediterranean Sea.

== The 2015 migration crisis ==
More than 1.3 million migrants reached European shores in 2015 alone, and more than 3,500 individuals died attempting the journey. The number of deaths is likely much higher, as there are presumably a large number of individuals whose bodies were never recovered from the sea. More than 75% of these migrants were fleeing conflicts present in Syria, Afghanistan, and Iraq. The major contributing factors to this can be traced to 2011 with the beginning of the Arab Spring and large-scale wars in the Middle East. The majority of these crossings are estimated to have been facilitated by smugglers. As smuggling networks vary in size and capacity, so do the methods they employ. For example, on the Central Mediterranean route – which is longer and more dangerous than the other routes – larger vessels are often used. These are typically unseaworthy and overloaded. In 2015, about 1.3 million people applied for asylum in the EU, Norway and Switzerland, nearly twice the previous high recorded in 1992. This figure counts asylum applications across those countries, not arrivals by sea.

== Migrant smuggling ==
Within migrant communities, smuggling is often viewed as a necessary means of reaching safety and opportunity in Europe. Smugglers are sometimes portrayed as service providers, facilitating journeys that would otherwise be impossible for many individuals to achieve on their own. The scale of migration across the Mediterranean is significant. The majority of arrivals are adult men, though there has been an increase in the number of migrants who are unaccompanied minors. These individuals are primarily teenage boys, but a small number of young girls are also smuggled across these routes each year.

The profile of smugglers is diverse, ranging from local groups to larger transnational networks that often rely on loose agreements to facilitate cooperation between them. Although the business is male-dominated, women also play important roles in recruitment and logistical work. Fees for smuggling services vary based on factors such as citizenship, gender, age, and perceived economic status. The price of a journey ranges from a few hundred to thousands of euros per person. Smuggling operations in Libya alone generate hundreds of millions of Euros annually, illustrating the scale of this underground market related to the crossings of the Mediterranean Sea.

Smuggling networks demonstrate adaptability and resilience in the face of increased enforcement efforts, and their internal dynamics are not well understood. These networks are highly flexible and work efficiently within an ever-changing market of individuals seeking to flee their countries of origin. They are often made up of independent and family-based groups that partner for short periods to complete their task. While some migrants use smugglers for a specific leg of their journey, others rely on them for every step of it. The services can include transportation, forged documentation, and accommodation. Most migrants pay as they go, meaning that the final destination is not predetermined, and the direction and pace of their travel depend on how quickly they can pay for what the smugglers require. Others pay the full fee in advance while still in their country of origin, after which the smuggler arranges the journey to Europe. Those who survive the journey are often the ones who promote the smuggling practices, as they encourage friends and family to use similar methods to enter Europe.

A 2018 study highlights the decentralized nature of smuggling operations in the Mediterranean Sea, particularly between Libya and the Italian island of Lampedusa. Wiretapped conversations revealed a smuggling network linking the Horn of Africa to Northern Europe, involving 292 individuals. The majority of smugglers were male, and would often take on roles as “organizers” or “aides”. Payment systems lacked centralization, relying on informal money transfers. Migrant smuggling networks are also linked to many other forms of organized crime rings, including human trafficking and money laundering. From the range of services offered, it is estimated that the annual turnover from smuggling reached EUR 3-6 billion in 2015 alone, but some believe the figure to be much higher. The decentralized structure of these networks presents significant challenges for authorities and underscores the need for coordinated efforts, information sharing, land-based policy responses, and cooperation with countries along the smuggling routes.

Economic crisis in several regions led to demand for crossing to the European Union remaining high in 2026. By April 2026, bad weather had made the trip more challenging and 683 migrants drowned on their way from North Africa to Europe as estimated by the IOM in the first 3 months of 2026. With IOM resources for observation limited in main departure states like Tunisia and Libya, some activists estimated the number of drowned migrants at up to 1,000 during January 2026 Storm Harry alone. With coast guard activity reduced during bad weather, human traffickers offered the trip for less than half the normal price. The locally produced metal boats without a keel, provided by the traffickers, are often not stable enough to withstand heavy seas, contributing to the losses.

== Actors and responses ==
To address the challenges of irregular migration and migrant smuggling, actors such as the EU, UN, NATO and the African Union have implemented various measures to limit migration across the Mediterranean Sea.

In the wake of the 2015 migration crisis, several maritime security operations were launched, including Operation Triton (2014–2018), conducted by Frontex, and Operation Sophia (2015–2020), led by the EU with the aim of countering migrant smuggling networks. Since then, other operations have followed.

It is typical for maritime security operations to involve overlapping mandates, which is also the case in the Mediterranean. NATO’s Operation Sea Guardian (2016–present) includes sanctions enforcement, search and rescue, and interdiction operations against migrant smuggling. Although NATO’s role is limited, Operation Sea Guardian is intended to support EU, Turkish, and Greek authorities in deterring smuggling networks operating from Turkey to Europe. The EU's current operation, Operation IRINI, replaced Operation Sophia and focuses on disrupting migrant smuggling and enforcing the UN arms embargo on Libya. In March 2025, the European Council extended the mandate of Operation IRINI until 2027.

The role of Frontex expanded after the 2015 migration crisis, and several joint operations have since been conducted. Frontex also supports coordination between EU Member States in managing external borders. The EU’s overall approach has evolved to include not only border patrol and protection, but also a more outward-facing and militarized strategy involving a higher level of coercive capacity to combat both migrant smuggling and human trafficking.

Non-governmental organizations (NGOs) are also active in maritime security in the Mediterranean, particularly in relation to irregular migration and migrant smuggling. NGOs such as SOS Méditerranée, Médecins Sans Frontières, and Sea-Watch have conducted search and rescue operations. These organizations emphasize humanitarian obligations and the lack of sufficient state or EU action as justification for their efforts, arguing that the current focus is too heavily placed on border control rather than on protecting vulnerable lives at sea. Some governments, however, contend that NGO-led rescue efforts may unintentionally encourage more migrants to attempt dangerous crossings.

Although multiple actors have taken measures to reduce irregular migration and combat smuggling, these measures have also produced unintended consequences. Research suggests that increased border restrictions and the criminalization of both irregular migration and migrant smuggling may strengthen the smuggling networks they aim to disrupt. As policies become more restrictive, smuggling networks adapt by developing more professional and hierarchical structures that are better equipped to navigate intensified enforcement measures introduced by actors. In this way, human smuggling evolves in response to, rather than despite, tighter border controls. Resorting to smugglers is often a response to the lack of safe migration pathways, legal documents, or awareness of legal options. For example, EU Search and Rescue (SAR) missions have influenced smuggling strategies by incentivizing smugglers to reach SAR zones, where migrants could then be rescued. These operations have been criticized for potentially encouraging risky sea crossings due to an expectation of rescue. In some cases, European states have been accused of pushbacks at sea – actions that are considered illegal and dangerous.

In response to the continued challenges, the EU adopted the Pact on Migration and Asylum in 2024; its new rules began applying on 12 June 2026. One of its pillars – “Embedding migration in international partnerships” – includes measures specifically aimed at combating migrant smuggling through dedicated and tailor-made Anti-Smuggling Operational Partnerships with partner countries and UN agencies, targeting smuggling in key regions. Another element of this pillar is the prevention of irregular migration, which also includes reinforced cooperation with Frontex.

Both the responses and the ongoing criticism illustrate the contentious nature of the issue, as well as the continued efforts by various relevant actors to address migrant smuggling through international cooperation and evolving policies and measures.

== See also ==
- List of migrant vessel incidents on the Mediterranean Sea
