= Hellenic Rescue Team =

Greek non-governmental search and rescue organisation

- Ελληνική Ομάδα Διάσωσης/Elliniki Omada Diasosis
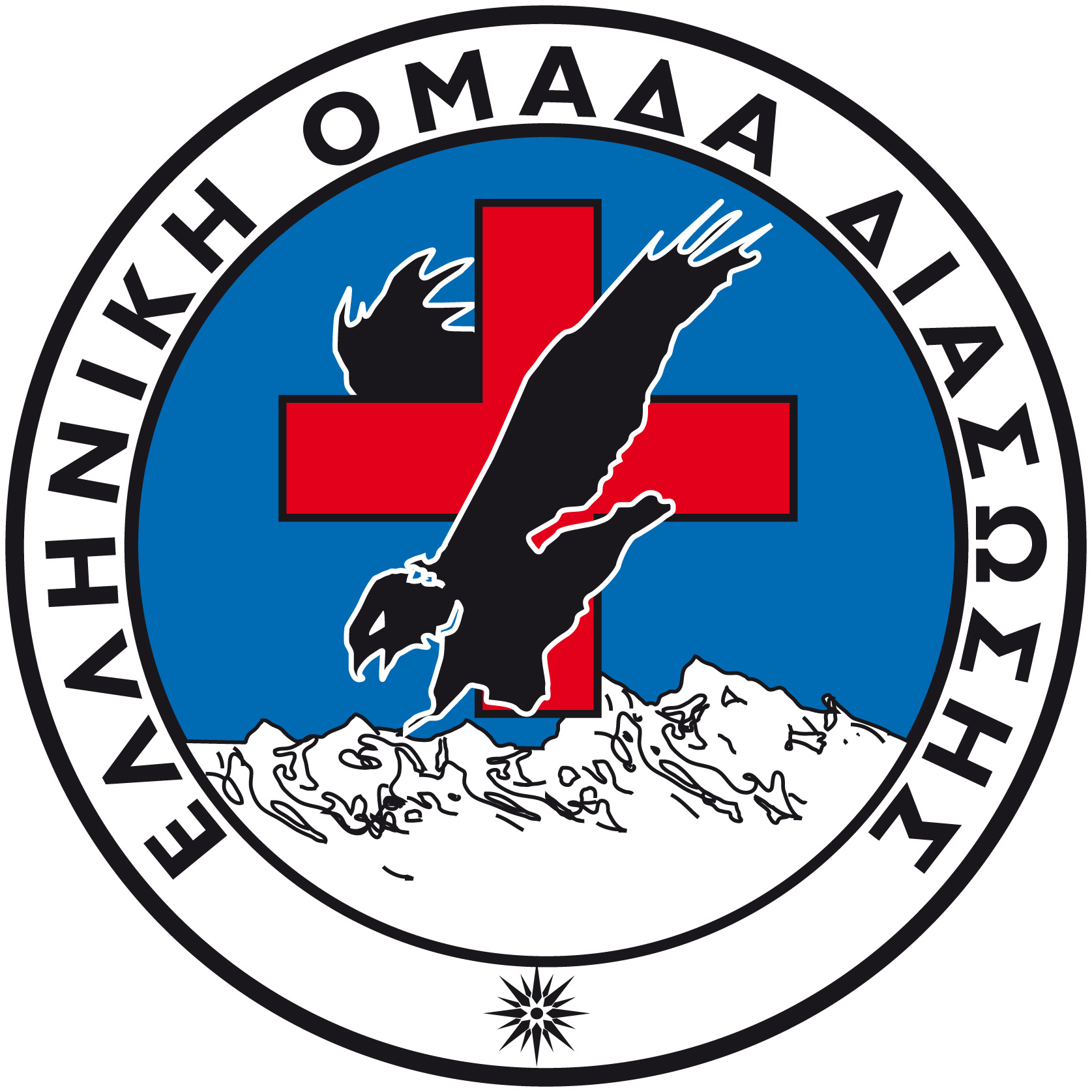
- Formation: 1978
- Headquarters: Thessaloniki, Greece
- Services: Search and rescue
- Chair: Fotis Sarigiannis
- Awards: Nansen Refugee Award (2016); Mother Teresa Award (2017)

The Hellenic Rescue Team (HRT; Greek: Ελληνική Ομάδα Διάσωσης, romanized: Elliniki Omada Diasosis) is a Greek non-governmental search and rescue organisation. It is run by volunteers and has operated since 1978. Since 1994 it is run as an association. HRC is cooperating with the Greek Ministry of Foreign Affairs and the European Union. The Hellenic Rescue Team was awarded with the Nansen Refugee Award in 2016 and Mother Teresa Award in 2017 for its role in the European refugee and migrant crisis.

== Organisation ==
The headquarters of the organisation is in Thessaloniki. There are 34 divisions of HRT in Greece. The United Nations International Search and Rescue Advisory Group officially recognised HRT on the 23 of June 2005.

HRT is also in continuous cooperation with both the United Nations Office for the Coordination of Humanitarian Affairs, the Greek Ministry of foreign Affairs, and European Community Humanitarian Office. It is the only Greek organisation that is part of the International Mountain Rescue Federation or the International Maritime Rescue Federation. It is also part of the International Rescue Dog Organization. The Hellenic Rescue Team works closely with the Civil Protection Secretariat, the Greek Coast Guard, the Greek Air Force, Greek Army Air Force, the Hellenic Navy Helicopters School, the Directorate of Transmission of Air Transport and the TENEF.

The organisation has over 3,000 volunteers. It carries out search and rescue operations in emergencies and disasters within Greece or in the sea surrounding Greece.

== History ==
The organisation has provided aid in international emergency situations since 1999. The first international deployment was in the earthquakes of Turkey (1999), followed by Algeria (2003), Morocco (2004), Iran (2004), and Indonesia (2005) - where full equipment was sent for the operation of a pre-hospital care centre for 10,000 people for two months - Pakistan (2005) and lastly the Lebanese crisis where it sent 23.5 tons of food and pharmaceutical products gathered through its network. The Greek Rescue Team also participated in the relief efforts in the 2010 Haiti earthquake.

The HRT received the Nansen Refugee Award in 2016 for its rescue efforts in 2015 where the organisation saved over 2,500 people in the Aegean sea. During that year the organisation undertook 1,035 rescue operations and additionally assisted over 7,000 people to safety In 2017, the organisation received the Mother Teresa award from the "Harmony Foundation" based in Mumbai, India. They received the award for their "heroic actions" during the migrant and refugee crisis.
