= List of ships for the rescue of refugees in the Mediterranean Sea =

Migrant and refugee rescue ships that operate in the Mediterranean Sea taking part in the rescue of people endangered when attempting to migrate across the Mediterranean to Europe are often run by NGOs. They are variously chartered, donated, or bought specifically for the purpose of rescue.

== Summary ==
The use of NGO rescue ships operating in the Mediterranean Sea to save migrants and refugees from drowning began with the vessel Phoenix being deployed by Migrant Offshore Aid Station in August 2014, after the end of the Italian Mare Nostrum rescue programme.

As of 1 June 2025, there remained 17 vessels (16 names were listed as active, with Mare Jonio under maintenance) and three aircraft operational, of the total of 43 vessels and four aircraft which by then had been deployed in this way. Of those 16 vessels, one (Aita Mari) had historically been subject to legal proceedings, and a further eight had legal cases hanging over them.

By the end of June 2026 21 ships and 5 aircraft associated with NGO's were active.

== List ==
This sortable table is by default listed in order of the vessels' names:

Ship	Organization	Flag	Length	Comment	Image
Aita Mari	Salvamento Marítimo Humanitario (SMH)	Spain	32 m	Blocked in Spain, Jan. - April 2019; Seized, Palermo May - Dec 2020. Resumed operations in Dec 2020 and (after pause due to accident to captain) ~Jan 2021 again resumed ops Oct. 2021	
Alan Kurdi (later ResQ PEOPLE)	Sea-Eye then Proem-Aid then RESQ (people saving people)	Germany	38.6 m	Formerly oceanographic vessel Professor Albrecht Penck. Began Dec. 2018 as Sea-Eye's third vessel, renamed Alan Kurdi Feb 2019; Seized, Palermo, May - June 2020; Seized, Olbia, Oct. 2020. Acquired by 'ResQ (people saving people)' in July 2021 and renamed ResQ PEOPLE. The ship was damaged by Storm Harry in early 2026 and repair was not economically viable.	Professor Albrecht Penck (Alan Kurdi)
Alex	Mediterranea Saving Humans	Italy	18 m	Sailing yacht; seized, Lampedusa, July 2019 - Feb. 2020. MSH also operate the Mare Jonio	
Aquarius	Médecins Sans Frontières / SOS Méditerranée	Gibraltar	77 m	Mission ended in December 2018. Followed by Ocean Viking	Aquarius
Astral	Proactiva Open Arms	Spain	30 m	Sailing yacht; Began SAR operations June 2016. Periods of maintenance since. Proactiva Open Arms also operate Golfo Azzurro and Open Arms Expected to sail again in mid-Nov. 2021	
Aurora (rescue ship)	Sea-Watch/SAR-Relief	Germany (since November 2022 )	14m	Formerly Earl and Countess Mountbatten of Burma RNLI "Trent" class lifeboat; technical support from SAR-Relief Call-sign MKIT4. Rescued 85 on first SAR voyage in May 2022. Picked up 44 migrants from an abandoned oilrig in April 2026. Engaged again in shuttle activity in September 2026, picking up 23 migrants from the Tunesian Hasdrubal platform. 17 migrants were picked up on 6 October.	
Aurora SAR 2 (rescue ship)	Sea-Watch/SAR-Relief	Germany (since June 2026)	14m	Formerly Dora Foster McDougall RNLI "Trent" class lifeboat. Acquired in 2025 by Sea-Watch to circumvent the Matteo Piantedosi legislation and force their way into the closest Italian port, like her sistership Aurora, based on its small size and limited supplies on board. It started by landing 40 African migrants in Lampedusa on 4 June. Followed by another 40 Africans on 16 June 2026.	
Bourbon Argos	Médecins Sans Frontières (Belgium)	Luxembourg	69 m	Bourbon Argos operated 2015–2016; see also Dignity I (2015–2016); Followed by Prudence (2016–2017) -Mission stopped in August 2017. MSF have also worked with MOAS, SOS Méditerranée, and Mediterranea Saving Humans.	
Dakini	Private	Germany	11 m	A Ketch used to scout for migrant boats. On 27 September 2024 the activists handed out life vests to migrants and waited for Italian patrol boats to arrive. In July 2025 Dakini provided supplies to 73 migrants before the group was picked up by another NGO. An Italian detention order was later revoked.	
Dignity 1 (later Sea-Watch 3)	Médecins Sans Frontières	France	50 m	Stopped operations 2016 Transferred to Sea-Watch NGO, Renamed Sea Watch 3	
Geo Barents	Médecins Sans Frontières	Norway	77 m	Former seismic vessel built 2007. Missions started 13 May 2021. In June 2021 ~400 migrants rescued by Geo Barents and landed in Augusta, but then detained by Italian authorities on 2 July 2021. Resumed operations August 2021. Operations suspended, December 2024. Replaced by MSF with the smaller Oyvon.	Geo Barents, Stavanger Harbour, 2012
Golfo Azzurro	Proactiva Open Arms	Panama	40 m	Began operations late 2016. Ended before summer 2025. Proactiva Open Arms also operate a sailing yacht Astral, and Open Arms.	
VOS Hestia	Save the Children (operation Rescue at sea)	Italy	59 m	Stopped 3 month operation in October 2016	
Humanity 1 (ex- Sea-Watch 4)	SOS Humanity	Germany	60.7 m	Humanity 1 from August 2022; 21st mission began August 2025	
Humanity 2	SOS Humanity	Germany	24 m	The sailboat began overhaul on 14 November 2025 and is expected to be in service by mid 2026.	
Imara	r42 inititative	Germany	14 m	based Licata, Sicily: Schooner (MMSI 211375670)	
Iuventa	Jugend Rettet	Netherlands	33 m	Seized in Trapani (Sicily) since August 2017 on allegation of cooperation with migrant smugglers	
Josefa	RESQSHIP	Germany	14 m	Sailing yacht; operated April - Oct. 2019; Resqship resumed operations in June 2021 with newer 18m ketch, the Nadir.	
Life (ex-Seefuchs, c/o Sea-Eye)	Proem-Aid	Spain	26 m	Intended for use for training and raising awareness	
Life Support	Emergency	Panama	51 m	Converted supply vessel. Active since December 2022.	
Lifeline (ex-Sea-Watch 2)	Mission Lifeline	Netherlands	32 m	Seized, Malta, July 2018. Sold in 2020.	Lifeline
Lifeline SAR	Mission Lifeline		28.5 m	Former German customs vessel from 1992, acquired in 2025, rebuild in 2026.	Lifeline SAR
M.V. Louise Michel	none/ technical assistance from SAR-Relief	Germany	30.3 m	Former French Navy boat Suroît, refitted to perform search and rescue, with technical support from SAR-Relief; registered as pleasure craft. Active from August 2020, blocked by EU authorities from leaving port of Borriana (Burriana, Spain) since Oct 2020 due to registration issues.	
Maldusa	Maldusa	Italy	10 m	Operating from May 2024	
Mare*Go (ex-Sea-Watch and ex-Mare Liberum)	Zusammenland (NGO), formerly operated by Sea-Watch and Mare Liberum (NGO)	Germany	21 m	Formerly SEA-WATCH and Mare Liberum; renamed upon transfer to Mare*Go. Jan 2023 - May 2023 shipyard and starting operations in June 2023 Operational June 2023-July 2024	
Mare Jonio	Mediterranea Saving Humans	Italy	37.5 m	Active since October 2018. Declared subject to mandatory maintenance work- in port -Venice (Italy)- since Nov. 2020 MSH also operate the sailing vessel Alex.	
Mare Liberum (ex-Sea-Watch)	Mare Liberum (NGO), formerly operated by Sea-Watch and subsequently (June 2023-July 2024) by Zusammenland (NGO)	Germany	21 m	Formerly SEA-WATCH; renamed upon transfer to Mare Liberum. Since 2017 no longer a rescue ship but monitors the Aegean. Blocked from operating, Oct 2021; Mare Liberum (NGO) disbanded May 2023	"Mare Liberum"
Mediterranea (yacht)	Mediterranea Saving Humans	Italy	16 m	(MMSI 247033270)	
Mediterranea (ex-Sea-Eye 4)	Mediterranea Saving Humans	Germany	53 m	Former offshore supply vessel, Purchased by Sea-Eye 2020, began operations 2021 as Sea-Eye 4. Sold to Mediterranea Saving Humans in 2025 and renamed Mediterranea. It continued to operate under German flag.	
Minden	Lifeboat Project / German Sea Rescue Society	Germany	23 m	Aegean Sea, March 2016 - July 2016; Libya / Lampedusa, July 2016 - September 2017. No longer operational	Minden
Mission Eleonore	Mission Lifeline	Germany	20 m	Former fishing boat, registered as a pleasure boat. Began August 2019; Seized, Pozzallo, Sept. 2019	
Mo Chara	Refugee Rescue	United Kingdom	7.4 m	ex-RNLI Atlantic 75 Began early 2016; paused operations August 2020	
Nadir	RESQSHIP	Germany	18 m	Following operations with Sailing yacht Josefa, April - Oct. 2019, Resqship resumed operations in June 2021 with an 18m ketch, the Nadir.	
Ocean Viking	SOS Méditerranée / Médecins Sans Frontières	France	69 m	Active since July 2019 Seized, Sicily, July 2020; Nov. 2020 at shipyard in port of Augusta (Sicily) Resumed ops Jan 2021 (maintenance in Naples May–June 21)	Ocean Viking at anchor, 2011
Open Arms	Proactiva Open Arms	Spain	37 m	Resumed operations in November 2020, but later detained on 15 April 2021 in Pozzallo (Sicily) after completing a mission; permitted to return to Borriana (Burriana, Spain) on 29 June 2021 for required maintenance. Proactiva Open Arms also operate Golfo Azzurro and Astral Resumed ops Oct 2021	Open Arms
Open Arms Uno	Proactiva Open Arms	Spain	66 m	May 2022 - August 2023, donated by Enrique Piñeyro; in September 2024 re-named Solidaire and operated by Solidaire NGO.	
Oyvon	Médecins Sans Frontières	Germany	20 m	Put in service in November 2025 as replacement for the larger Geo Barents with a crew of 10 MSF activists under German flag. MMSI 257326900	
Phoenix	Migrant Offshore Aid Station	Belize	40 m	September 2017, MOAS mission in Mediterranean ended; vessel transferred to assisting displaced Rohingya in Myanmar	
VOS Prudence	Médecins Sans Frontières Belgique	Italy	75 m	Stopped operations in Oct. 2017	VOS Prudence
ResQ PEOPLE (ex-Alan Kurdi)	ResQ (people saving people)	Germany	39 m	Formerly the Alan Kurdi; sailed to start rescue missions 7 August 2021 On first mission rescued initially 85 people, before docking at Syracuse with 166 refugees aboard. October 15, disembarked 58 rescued persons at Pozzallo at end of 2nd mission.	
Rise Above	Mission Lifeline	Germany	25 m	Former German navy vessel. Converted to SAR role in early 2021. Began operations in 2021 and was phased out in early 2025 due to maintenance issues.	Schleswig-Holstein,_Wewelsfleht,_Rise_Above_NIK_1002_
Safira	Mediterranea Saving Humans	Italy	16 m	(Safira 2, MMSI 247135720)	
Sarah (1986 ship)	Search and Rescue for all Humans (NGO)	Germany	22.63 m	former motor yacht Zamba, acquired 2023 Phased out in 2026 due to maintenance issues and replaced by sailing boat Thetis II in July 2026.	
Sea-Eye	Sea-Eye	Netherlands	26 m	Stopped operations after contestation of NL flag and seizure in Malta in July 2018; Subsequent sister ship Seefuchs	Sea-Eye
Sea-Eye 4 (later Mediterranea)	Sea-Eye	Italy	53 m	Former offshore supply vessel, Purchased 2020, began operations 2021 as Sea-Eye 4 (Successor to Sea-Eye, Seefuchs, and Alan Kurdi); detained in Palermo on 5 June 2021. Resumed ops Aug 2021 Sold to Mediterranea Saving Humans in 2025 and renamed Mediterranea.	
Sea-Eye 5	Sea-Eye & United4Rescue	Germany	28m	The NIS RANDERS, a former German Sea Rescue Society boat, was bought in 2024. From Autumn 2024, operating in the Mediterranean as Sea-Eye 5.	
Sea Punk I	Sea Punks	Germany	27.2m	(UK registered, Offshore Support Vessel built in 1969, MMSI 232045720) Active since September 2023	
Sea-Watch (later Mare Liberum)	Sea-Watch; subsequently operated by Mare Liberum (NGO),	Germany	21 m	Renamed upon transfer to Mare Liberum, 2018.	Sea-Watch
Sea-Watch 2 (later Lifeline)	Sea-Watch; subsequently operated by Mission Lifeline	Germany	32 m	Sold to Mission Lifeline and renamed Lifeline, autumn 2016	Lifeline as Sea-Watch 2
Sea-Watch 3 (ex-Dignity 1)	Sea-Watch	Netherlands	50 m	Seized, Sicily, July 2020, Sept. 2020 in port at Burriana (Spain) Resumed ops July 2021	
Sea-Watch 4 (later Humanity 1)	Sea-Watch (later SOS Humanity)	Germany	60.7 m	Active since August 2020; Seized (Palermo) Oct 2020 Resumed ops Oct 2021. Transferred to SOS Humanity August 2022	
Sea-Watch 5	Sea-Watch	Germany	58 m	Active since December 2023	
Sebastian K	Mare Liberum (NGO)	Germany	14.5 m	Beneteau sailing yacht, acquired 2020	
Seefuchs (aka 'sister ship to Sea-Eye', later Life)	Sea-Eye	Netherlands	26 m	Sea-Eye's second ship; Stopped SAR operations in 2018. Then was donated to Proem-Aid and renamed ‘Life’. Sold, used for smuggling and seized by Spanish authorities in 2021.	Seefuchs
Solidaire	Solidaire.ong	Germany	66 m	Ex- Open Arms Uno; Operating with the Solidaire NGO from October 2024. Following a first voyage in October 2024, the vessel made multiple rescues during 2025 - and further missions in January, May and June 2026.	
TROTAMAR III	Compass Collective	Germany	13 m	Wauquiez Amphitrite 43 sailboat, started patrols in August 2023 The activists decided on multiple occasions, based on alleged human rights concerns, not communicate with local coast guards after rescue operations and headed straight for Lampedusa instead, resulting in the impoundment of TROTAMAR III by Italy: in August 2025, for failing to inform the Libyan coast guard, and again in April 2026 for failing to inform the Tunisian coast guard. Repeated on 30 June 2026, when the activists transport 17 migrants to Lampedusa without coordinating with Libyan authorities.	

== Further related facilities ==
Since 2017, Sea-Watch have operated a SAR-coordinating reconnaissance aircraft, Moonbird, a single-engined Cirrus SR22, and since June 2020, also the Seabird, a twin-engined high-performance Beechcraft Baron 58. These are flown in cooperation with the Swiss NGO Humanitarian Pilots Initiative. In 2025, with the assistance of United4Rescue, the Seabird 3 reconnaissance aircraft began service.

In December 2020, Association Pilotes Volontaires began operation of their Dyn'Aéro MCR4S reconnaissance aircraft named Colibri 2. Their original Colibri, of the same make, flew its first mission in May 2018. As of June 2019, they had logged 52 missions, sighting 54 boats and by their estimates saving more than 4,300 people.

In May 2024, the Italian Civil Aviation Authority banned NGO SAR aircraft from operating from five airports in Sicily and nearby islands: Lampedusa, Palermo Bocca di Falco, Palermo Punta Raisi, Pantelleria and Trapani.

== Further related organisations ==
Search and Rescue Observatory for the Mediterranean (SAROBMED), based at Queen Mary University of London, monitored SAR operations in the region until January 2019. SAROBMED in turn had listed a number of other organisations, including:

- Alarm Phone
- Borderline Europe
- Equal Rights
- The AIRE Centre

In conjunction with Alarm Phone, Watch the Mediterranean Sea monitors deaths and violations of migrants' rights at the maritime borders of the EU via an online mapping platform. Caminando Fronteras advocates for migrants' rights at the borders of the EU. The Civil Maritime Rescue Coordination Centre (CMRCC) began work in 2022 coordinating and documenting events in the Central Mediterranean Sea involving people in distress. Hand in hand goes the Malta Migration Archive that documents the non-assistance of the Maltese coast guards and reporting the illegal actions of the Libyan actors in the Maltese search and rescue zone.

The German-based international movement Seebrücke has campaigned since 2018 for the humanitarian rights for people to migrate.

== Recently emerging organisations ==
In July 2021, after a period of planning and fund-raising, the Italian group 'RESQ (people saving people)' announced their acquisition of the Alan Kurdi, which was renamed ResQ PEOPLE; they began preparing the ship for new rescue operations. RESQ PEOPLE sailed from Borriana on 7 August 2021 to start rescue missions in the central Mediterranean.

Since then, a number of further ships have been deployed for refugee rescue on the Mediterranean, mostly within existing organisations, to bolster their fleets or replace ageing and uneconomical vessels. For various reasons, (some deterred by the uncooperative approach of the Italian authorities within an unsympathetic European framework) some NGOs have ceased operations in the Mediterranean. Some new organisations have emerged, notably Compass Collective, Maldusa, Sea Punks, Search and Rescue for all Humans, Solidaire and Zusammenland.

As of June 2025, the European Union Agency for Fundamental Rights listed 17 vessels (one under maintenance) and three surveillance aircraft still operated on the Mediterranean by NGOs.

== See also ==
=== Background ===
- Environmental migrant
- European migration crisis
- List of migrant vessel incidents on the Mediterranean Sea

=== National and international operations ===
- Operation Mare Nostrum
- Operation Triton
- Operation Themis
- Operation Sophia
