= SAROBMED =

SAROBMED, the Search and Rescue Observatory for the Mediterranean, was a consortium of researchers, civil society groups, and other organisations with interests in the field of cross-border maritime migration. The focus was in particular on providing a monitoring system for refugee travel in the Mediterranean Sea.

== History ==
SAROBMED was set up by Dr Violeta Moreno-Lax of Queen Mary University of London. Its website lists incidents documented from 24 April 2017 to 19 January 2019. During this time, its associated researchers produced a number of publications in the field of refugee safety in transit. It made submissions to the United Nations. Its model for monitoring incidents was viewed favourably.

== NGO partners ==
In addition to researchers from academia, SAROBMED listed the following NGOs as partners:

- Médecins Sans Frontières
- Jugend Rettet
- Sea-Watch
- Proactiva Open Arms
- Proem-Aid
- Mission Lifeline
- Salvamento Marítimo Humanitario
- Borderline Europe
- Refugee Rescue
- SOS Méditerranée
- Alarm Phone
- Sea-Eye
- Mare Liberum
- The AIRE Centre
- Equal Rights
