= Sea-Eye 5 =

German rescue ship operated by Sea-Eye

Sea-Eye 5 is a rescue ship operated by the German humanitarian organisation Sea-Eye for saving those in danger on the Mediterranean Sea.

== Background ==
On 19 July 2021, Sea-Eye announced that the Alan Kurdi (their third rescue ship) would be sold to the Italian maritime rescue organization RESQ-People for €400,000; From August 2020 to 2025 Sea-Eye operated Sea-Eye 4. In 2025 the operation of the 53m Sea-Eye 4 was deemed economically no longer viable under the Piantedosi-rules and it was handed over to "Mediterranea".

== The vessel ==
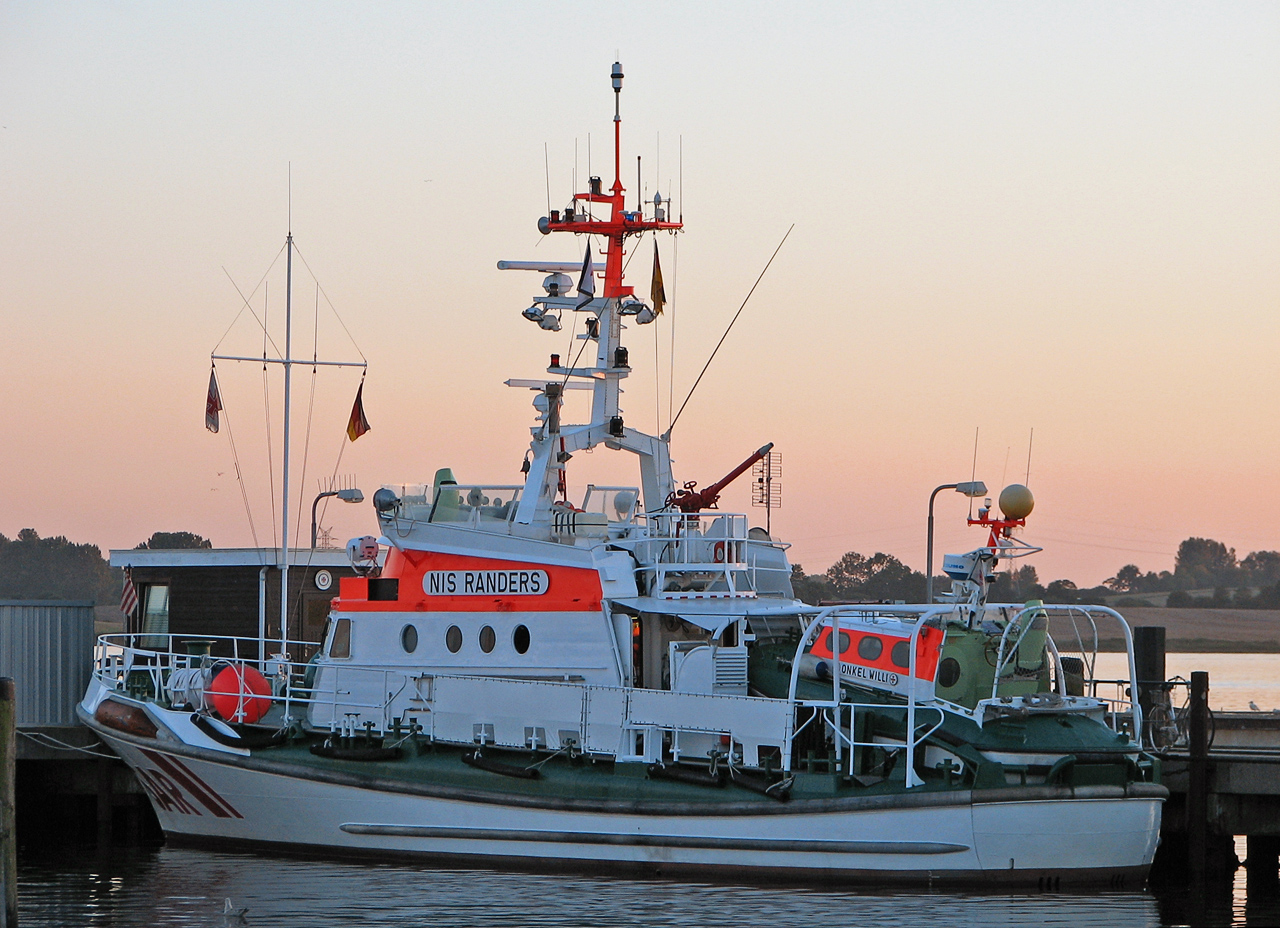
Nis Randers in 2005.

The 23.3-meter-class cruiser Nis Randers was originally put in service on 29 May 1990 with the German Maritime Search and Rescue Service, DGzRS in Bremen and was deployed in Maasholm. In 2018 it was replaced by the 20-meter-class cruiser FRITZ KNACK. Nis Randers was sold to a private Investor in Croatia.

In June 2024, in a joint press release, United4Rescue and Sea-Eye announced that they had purchased the former Nis Randers from a private owner for €465,000. The ship was then converted and overhauled to be used for rescue missions in the Mediterranean under the name Sea-Eye 5.

On completion of the work, the boat was named at a ceremony in Ancona by Sandra Hüller and Omorogbe Peter Obamwonyi, Maritime Crew Manager at Sea-Eye.

The boat is equipped with a sickbay and its MMSI is 218049720.

== Operations ==
SEA-EYE 5 began Mediterranean rescue operations at the end of October 2024. In the first two weeks of operation, it is claimed that SEA-EYE 5 saved 175 people.

In June 2025 it was detained by the Italian authorities at Pozzallo. After rescuing 65 migrants from an overcrowded rubber dinghy, a complex exchange of messages with the port authorities and the Maritime Rescue Coordination Center in Rome finally appeared to permit their disembarkation at Pozzallo, but the boat was then detained. The week before, the vessel Nadir of RESQSHIP had been similarly detained. The Civil Court of Ragusa ruled in March 2026 that the seizure of the ship had been unlawful and that the Government had to pay the NGOs legal fees.

In late July 2025 Sea-Eye 5 picked up another 31 migrants in two sorties. Two migrants were evacuated to shore in advance, the rest were brought variously (during the first sortie) to Reggio Calabria and (during the second sortie) to Vibo Valentia.

In late September 2026, guided by the "Sea Bird 2" aircraft, the Sea-Eye 5 crew located and picked up 24 migrants. They were assigned the port of Palermo for disembarkation. The activists reported technical difficulties and were allowed to proceed to the closer port of Lampedusa instead. On 14 November 2026 the activists picked up 9 migrants from Pakistan and Syria in the Maltese SAR zone. The Sea-Eye 5 was ordered by Italian authorities to Crotone for disembarcation. Another 45 migrants were picked up from rubber boats in the Libyan rescue zone on 20 November. 6 people were transfered to the Italian coastguard as emergencies, while the remaining migrants were transported to Messina.
