= Mare Jonio =

Mare Jonio may refer to:

- The Ionian Sea (in Italian)
- ST Mare Jonio, a tug ship launched in 1943 as Empress Belle
- Mare Jonio (rescue ship), originally constructed as a tugboat in 1972
