= Refugee Rescue =

Northern Irish non-governmental organisation

Refugee Rescue is a charitable Non-Governmental Organisation based in Northern Ireland which operates the rescue vessel Mo Chara from the North Shore of Lesvos, Greece, covering parts of the Aegean Sea. It also fulfills a coastguard role along that coast.

== History ==
Refugee Rescue was founded in 2015, by Joby Fox and Jude Bennett; the charity moved rapidly on from an initial coastguard-like role to purchasing and operating an inshore rescue boat. Refugee Rescue's rescuer and activist Mary Finn was featured in the documentary "Bigger than us", drawing attention to the problems of people-trafficking and refugees.

== Rescue vessel ==
Refugee Rescue operates the Mo Chara (meaning 'my friend' in Irish), a 7.4 m ex-RNLI Atlantic 75 Rigid Inflatable Boat (RIB). The boat operations began in early 2016, and were paused in August 2020. As of April 2021, Mo Chara operates in conjunction with the German search and rescue NGO Sea-Eye and their rescue ship Sea-Eye 4. In early 2023, the NGO announced a formal partnership with Sea-Eye; at this date Refugee Rescue had rescued over 16,000 people since 2015.
