= Mediterranea Saving Humans =

Mediterranea Saving Humans APS
- Formation: 4 October 2018
- Founded at: Bologna (Italy)
- Type: Civil society reality platform
- Purpose: Monitoring and possible aid to those who risk dying in the Central Mediterranean
- Key people: Laura Marmorale (president)
- Website: mediterranearescue.org

Mediterranea Saving Humans APS is an Italian "civil society platform" that carries out rescue operations in the Mediterranean sea. Though it is similar to the many NGOs operating in the Mediterranean it is not actually an NGO, it brings together heterogeneous organizations and individuals, secular and religious, social and cultural, unions and political, who decided to take a stand against the deaths and the human rights violations committed daily in the Mediterranean Sea. It was founded in 2018 to keep watch of the situation in the Mediterranean sea and to save lives in difficulty after the majority of other NGOs were not able to act due the legal obstacles created by the Italian authorities. The group coordinates the search and rescue operations of the ships Mare Jonio, Mediterranea (formerly Sea-Eye 4) and Alex which sail under the Italian flag. The project also has the support of the German association Sea-Watch and the Spanish Proactiva Open Arms. It has carried out several search and rescue operations in the Central Mediterranean Sea with the ship Mare Jonio. Recognition of the work of Mediterranea has come from Pope Francis.

== History ==
Mediterranea Saving Humans was born as an activist project in 2018, originally called Operation Mediterranean. The platform was launched by activists Luca Casarini, Beppe Caccia, Alessandro Metz, with the first financial contributions from the philosopher Michael Hardt, financial broker and writer Guido Maria Brera, Associazione Ricreativa e Culturale Italiana (ARCI), and the Italian political party Sinistra Italiana. Mare Jonio is the first rescue ship in the Mediterranean to fly an Italian flag and cannot legally be refused entry to an Italian port. The Mediterranea project was not born as a humanitarian project, but a political project to challenge anti-migrant policies and the aggressive racism in Italy, Europe and beyond.

In 2025 the Sea-Eye charity decided that operation of Sea-Eye 4 was economically no longer viable to operate under the Piantedosi-rules and it was handed over to Mediterranea Saving Humans.

In September 2025 the organisation was awarded the MarEtica award by a jury of authors and media professionals during the festival of the same name in Procida.

== Selected operations ==
=== May 2019 ===
On 9 May 2019, the Mare Jonio and the Italian Coast Guard saved almost 66 people near the Libyan coast. Their boat had capsized in the sea and the Mare Jonio ship welcomed 30 people on board. The minister of the interior announced that neither ship had the permission to make the people land, but later they were authorized. The ship headed north, where it encountered the Italian authorities and was taken to Lampedusa. By order of the Internal ministry, on the night of the 10th the ship was seized and the crew were accused of aiding and abetting illegal immigration. The activists claimed they were undertaking research, and protested against a seizure. On 13 May the Attorney general of Agrigento rejected the preventive seizure for lack of evidence.

=== July 2019 ===
On 5 July 2019, the ship Alex, a yacht with a sail which had initially just been tasked with accompanying the Mare Jonio, reached the waters off the coast of Lampedusa with fifty four people on board, picked up the previous day. As had happened previously with Sea-Watch 3, the authorities initially refused the request to enter. The Italian government refused to accept people in Lampedusa and referenced Malta, some 100 km away, as an alternative. The spokesperson for the organisation, Alessandra Sciurba, declared the journey to be too long and impossible for the passengers on 6 July 2019. In the afternoon of 6 July 2019, the captain Tommaso Stella entered the port of Lampedusa without permission. The ship was overloaded more than three times the amount agreed upon by the eleven members of the crew. From a maritime point of view, therefore, refusal was not an option.

=== August–September 2019 ===
On 28 August the rescue ship Mare Jonio saved approximately 100 people from a refugee ship that was sinking. According to the survivors, six people, including children, had previously drowned. The Italian coast guard brought children and women on land in Lampedusa. Mare Jonio was forbidden from allowing the remaining 34 rescued people to reach land in an Italian port because the operators would have not respected the laws and caused an emergency situation. The authorisation to land "for health reasons" came from the captaincy of the port on 2 September, following a storm and a hunger strike that the migrants had started. The ship was subsequently confiscated until February 2020, when the jury accepted Mediterranea's appeal, immediately releasing the ship from seizure.

=== June–July 2020 ===
Halfway through March 2020 the organisation announced that its two ships, Mare Jonio and Alex would suspend their navigation due to the COVID-19 pandemic. Navigation resumed in the month of June. On the 19th there was the recovery of sixty people, who were able to land at Pozzallo without facing particular obstacles. On the 29th another forty-three people were rescued, and in subsequent days reached the shores of Augusta, Sicily. Since some of them had tested positive for the COVID-19 virus, the crew observed the mandatory quarantine, which ended without repercussions on 15 July.

=== September 2020 ===
On 11 September 2020, 27 migrants who had been on board the Maersk Etienne since 5 August after being rescued in international waters were transferred to the Mare Jonio and brought to shore.

=== April 2024 ===
Mare Jonio rescued 56 people on its 16th operation. Whilst assisting a vessel in distress (distributing life vests to people on a ship) the Mare Jonio was threatened by the Libyan 'coastguard'.

=== August 2024 ===
182 people were saved on Mare Jonio's 18th operation. A sailing ship belonging to Fondazione Migrantes of the Italian Episcopal Conference supported this operation by carrying additional volunteers, medical staff, a cultural mediator and journalists.

=== October 2024 ===
Fifty-eight people were saved after a tip-off from Alarm Phone from a ship that had departed from Libya.

== Funding and support ==
Mediterranea is supported with contributions and support from associations like ARCI and Ya Basta Bologna, NGOs like Sea-Watch, social enterprises and individuals. The project was made possible with a loan from an Italian ethical bank, Banca Etica, and a crowdfunding campaign with over 3000 supporters which raised over 1 million euros. When Mare Jonio was stopped and fined in May 2019, in less than two days they received the 65,000 euros needed to pay the fine through crowdfunding.

Pope Francis has publicly expressed support for the work of Mediterranea and their rescue mission. In December 2019 he received a cross with the life jacket that had been found floating in the sea. He had it placed at one of the entrances to the Apostolic Palace and wrote "I have decided to display this life-vest, 'crucified' on this cross, to remind us to keep our eyes open, to keep our hearts open, to remind everyone of the obligatory duty to save each human life. It is a moral responsibility that unites believers and non-believers." In August 2024, a sailing ship belonging to Fondazione Migrantes of the Episcopal Conference of Italy sailed alongside the Mare Jonio, carrying additional. volunteers, medical staff, a cultural mediator and journalists.

In May 2021 Mediterranea was awarded the Danish Shipping prize together with the Danish Maersk Etienne saving 27 refugees off Tunisia whose ship had been taking on water. The Maersk Etienne crew took the refugees on board but they were not allowed to disembark in Malta as the Maltese authorities said that the rescue did not happen in its territorial waters. On 11 September, after 38 days on board, the refugees were transferred to Mediterranea's Mare Jonio vessel, and subsequently permitted to land.

On 19 July 2022, the Italian rapper Ghali donated a RHIB (Rigid-Hull Inflatable Boat) to Mediterranea which he named Bayna, which means 'it is clear' in Arabic. He announced this on Instagram with a post saying: "I bought myself a boat".

== See also ==
- Hellenic Rescue Team
- Iuventa
- Migrant Offshore Aid Station
- No Border network
- Proactiva Open Arms
- Sea Watch
- SOS Méditerranée
