= Mare Liberum (ship) =

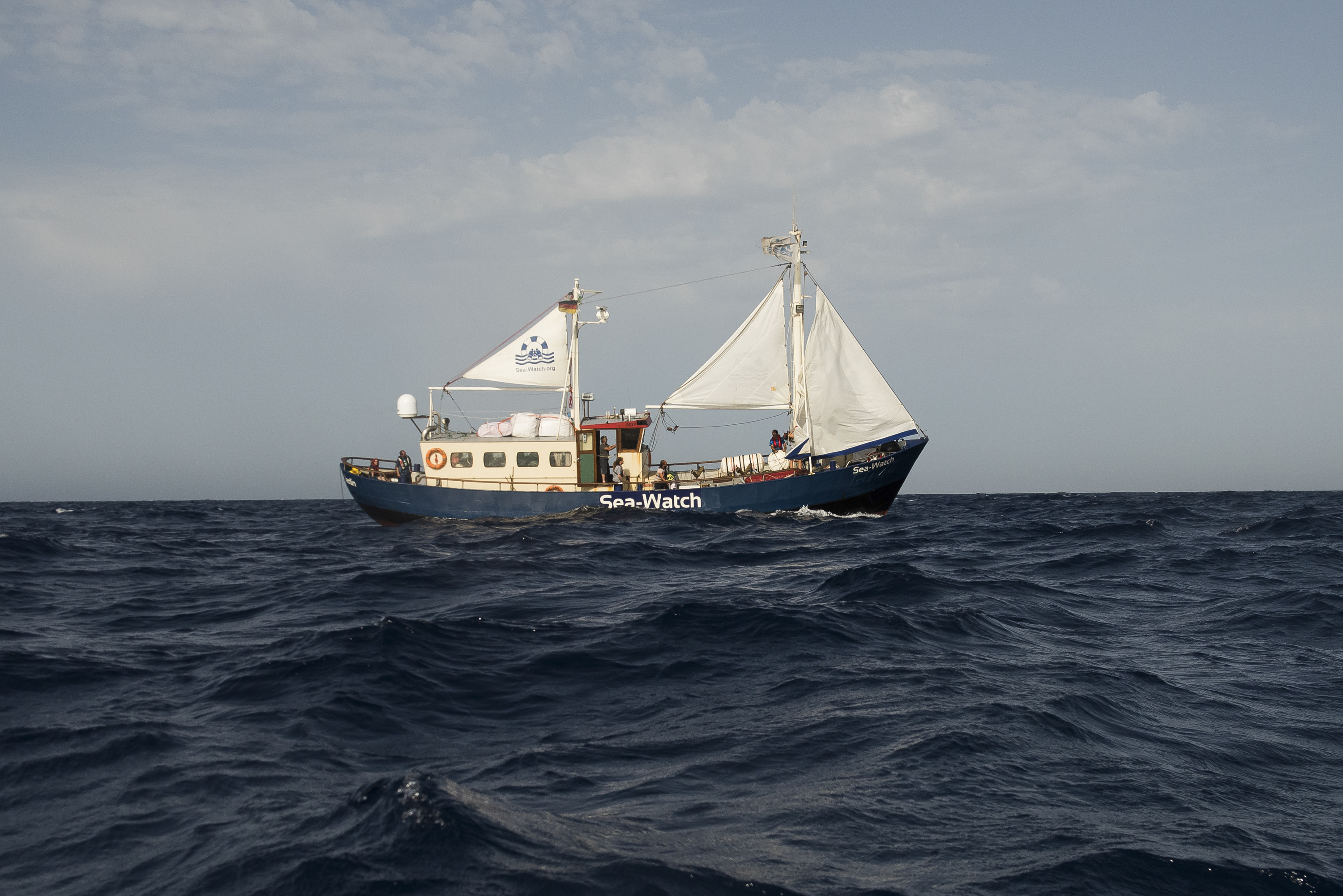
Sea-Watch on its first mission.

Mare Liberum was a ship operated privately by the Berlin-based human rights organization of the same name. Mare Liberum e.V. monitored human rights in the Aegean Sea from 2018 to their disbanding in May 2023. Until 2018, the ship had been used as Sea-Watch for the "Sea-Watch e.V." association. The ship operated under the German flag.

== History ==
The ship was laid down in 1917 at the Verenigde Scheepswerf "Vooruit" in Enkhuizen under the construction number 122 and completed as sail-powered fishing boat Waakzaamheid (VL226) for the Visserijmaatschapij Waakzaamheid in Vlaardingen. The vessel was one of a series of 15 steel barges for mussel and fish fishing that the shipyard built between 1910 and 1926. In 1923 the ship was sold to P. J. de Baare from Breskens, who used it as Catholina (BR20) and in 1929 equipped the boat with a Kromhout diesel engine of 50 hp, built in 1921.

In 1941 the German Navy confiscated the Catholina. On 24 July 1946, the owner received his ship back in Delfzijl.

In 1949, a 112 hp Deutz diesel engine built in 1943 replaced the older Kromhout unit. In 1952 the ship was jointly transferred to J.A., A. J. and P. J. de Baare. After a new engine was installed again in 1961, this time a Berliet MDO.3.M of 150 hp, a sale to C. J. Walbroek from Breskens and renaming to Klaas (BR29), which was planned in 1961, did not materialize. Instead, the de Baare brothers sold the ship in April 1964 to J. M. van Dorpel, who registered the boat as Wilhelmina (YE138) in Yerseke. In 1966, the ship received a forward-attacking cutter stem instead of the previous barge bow - the length increased to 20.99 meters. In 1969 a Kromhout 12.TV.120 diesel engine with an output of 248 hp replaced the previous engine and in 1971 the brothers A. & W. Sinke from Colijnsplaat acquired the vessel, retaining the same name.

In 1973 M. Letsch from Scheveningen took over the Wilhelmina and renamed her Alida Jojanna (SCH138), and the following year the 24-year-old Douwe Amels from Makkum bought the ship and named her Albertina (WON52). In 1976 the ship was sold again, this time to H. Bout from Colijnsplaat, who registered it in Kortgene and used it as Zeearend (KG5) until 1979, before passing it on to the Nelis brothers, who chose the name Albatros (KG12). In 1981 the company Van Dienst & Westdorp from Goedereede took over the cutter, called it De Wil en’t Gemoed, with the fishing vessel license number GO46, and had a Mitsubishi S6 BTK diesel engine of 240 hp installed. After the ship was once again transferred to A. van Dienst in 1983, she retired from commercial shipping in 1985 and was acquired by J. A. L. Jansen-Fijnaart as the leisure vessel Ran GO 46. In 1987 the ship received a new engine, a 340 hp MAN, which is still installed today.

== Sea-Watch ==
After many years of private use and an interim sale to the de Vogel family, Harald Höppner acquired the ship from Multiships shipbrokers in 2015 for the use of the privately financed Sea-Watch project. After a conversion and equipment for medical first aid, installation of a satellite system, life jackets and life rafts, the ship was renamed Sea-Watch and began the journey to the Mediterranean, where Sea-Watch used the former fishing cutter to rescue boat refugees at sea.

== Mare Liberum ==
In 2018 the boat was sold to the Mare Liberum e.V. association. Since then, the ship has been carrying out human rights monitoring at sea under the name Mare Liberum. The Aegean Sea is part of an escape route from Turkey to the Greek islands, on which there are frequent drownings.

The ship was temporarily detained in port in 2020 because the German Ministry of Transport (BMVI) had changed the Ship Safety Ordinance and NGO ships that are used for humanitarian or similar purposes are now confronted with requirements in terms of construction, equipment and crew that otherwise only commercial shipping must meet. So there was a request for a corresponding ship safety certificate from Mare Liberum for their two units, Mare Liberum and the 15m sailing yacht Sebastian K.

At the beginning of September 2020, the ship was searched by Greek border guards in Perama on Lesbos. The activists themselves complained about the "criminalization of human rights work" by the Greek authorities. On 28 September the Greek police announced in a press release that 35 people and four NGOs were being investigated on Lesbos. However, Mare Liberum was not officially named. On 2 October 2020, the Hamburg Administrative Court declared the Ministry's detention order inadmissible because the Ministry of Transport had failed to inform the European Commission of the draft of the amended regulation before it was enacted.

The Mare Liberum association was able to document a total of 321 incidents between March and December 2020, in which 9,798 refugees were forcibly driven back to Turkey. The Greek coast guard would have been the main protagonist and, according to survivors, Frontex and NATO were also involved in some cases.

== Mare*Go ==
The ship was renamed to Mare*Go upon transfer to Zusammenland (NGO); from January 2023 to May 2023 it underwent shipyard work before starting operations in June 2023

In late July 2024 the activists announced the end of their operation. According to their statement, political pressure and the formation of a new SAR zone under Tunisian jurisdiction could create a situation were they are ordered to bring people to Tunisia, which the activists deemed an "unsafe" place. Additionally the aging vessel proved increasingly difficult to maintain and smaller, faster vessels like Sea-Eye 5 and Sarah were the future.
