= Sea-Eye 4 =

History
- Name: Mediterranea
- Builder: Pattje BV, Waterhuizen, Netherlands
- Yard number: 296
- Laid down: 1972
- Launched: 1972
- Refit: 2020
- Identification: IMO number: 7214753; MMSI number: 211428870; Callsign: DHUQ2

General characteristics
- Displacement: 1,053 t (1,036 long tons)
- Length: 53.2 m (174 ft 6 in)
- Beam: 11.79 m (38 ft 8 in)
- Draught: 3.77 m (12 ft 4 in)
- Propulsion: 6 D 7 HDN 1,857 hp (1,385 kW)
- Speed: 11 knots (13 mph; 20 km/h)

Sea Eye 4 is an offshore supply ship that is used as a sea rescue ship. The Sea-Eye organisation moved the ship to the Mediterranean Sea in 2021 to rescue refugees. In the summer of 2025 the ship was renamed Mediterranea and sold to an NGO of the same name.

== History ==
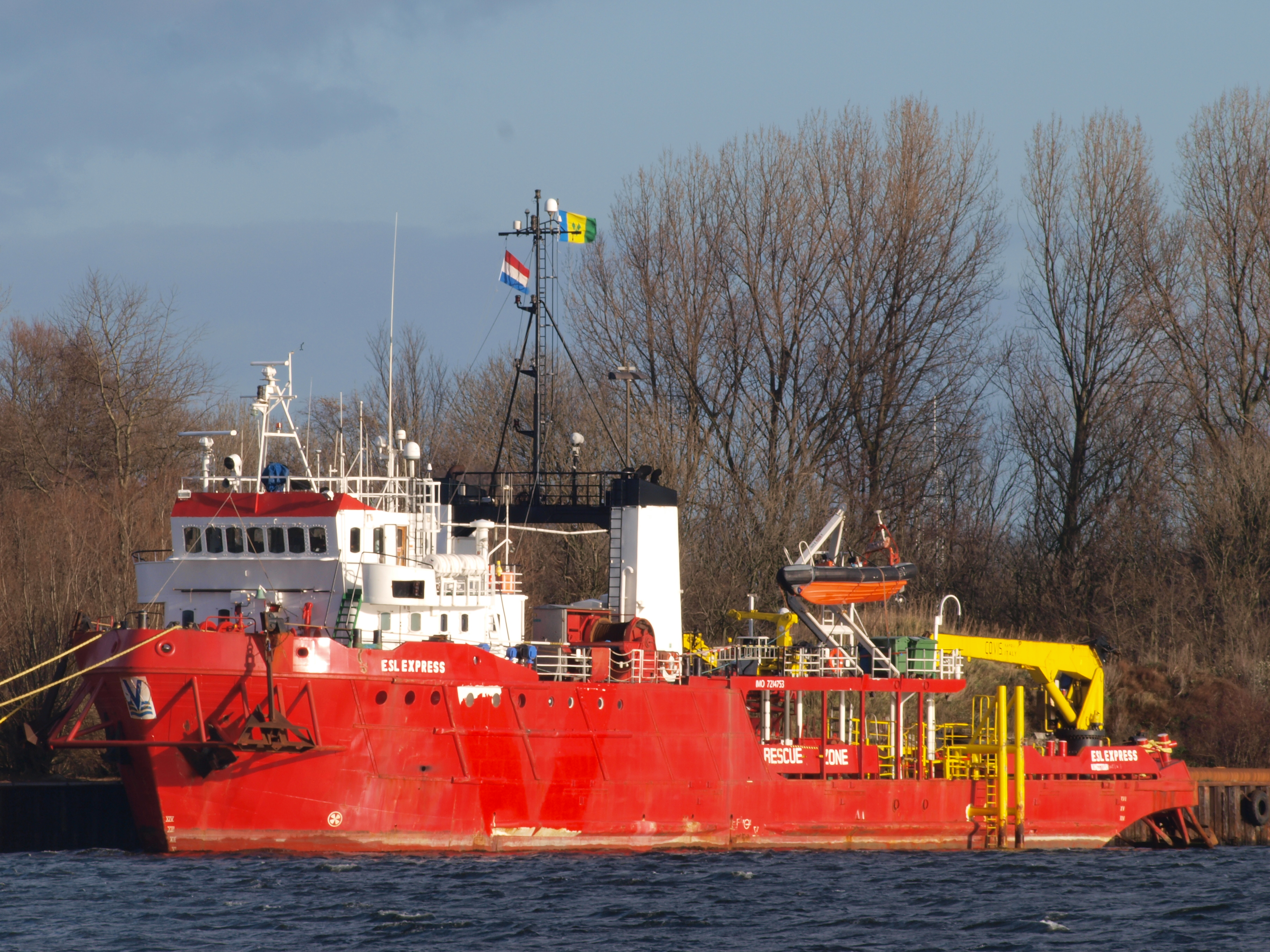
ESL Express, 2011

The ship was built under, construction number 296, at Scheepswerf Pattje in Waterhuizen, Netherlands, for the Norwegian shipping company Norway Supply Ships in Stavanger as an offshore supplier. It was launched as the West Eagle. In 1981 the ship was sold to Arvid Bergvall Jr. & Co., registered in Panama and renamed Springfield. In 1982 the ship went to the Dutch shipping company Vroon, which renamed it Oil Express. In 2011, Eagle Shipping bought the ship and renamed it ESL Express. The following year the ship went to Wind Express Shipping. The new name was Wind Express.

== As Sea Eye 4 ==
In October 2020, the ship was sold again and converted by the Sea-Eye organisation into a sea rescue ship to accommodate boat refugees. Among other things, an infirmary and two rescue boats that can be launched using cranes were retrofitted. United4Rescue had started a donation campaign on wirschickennocheinschiff.de ('we'll send another ship') for the purchase of the ship. More than 660 large and small organisations, initiatives, companies, associations and foundations from different areas of society came together in the alliance. Among other things, the alliance is supported by the German Trade Union Confederation (DGB), World Vision Germany, the Coordinating Council of Muslims and the Evangelical Church in Germany. The cost of buying and converting the ship and transferring it to the Mediterranean amounted to around one million euros.

With the ship renamed Sea-Eye 4, the organisation replaced the much smaller rescue ship Alan Kurdi, which it passed on to the Spanish organisation Proem-Aid. On 8 May 2021, Sea-Eye 4 began its operation from the Spanish port in Burriana to rescue migrants in need in the Mediterranean. The mission is supported by United4Rescue (alliance for civil sea rescue) and the aid organisation German Doctors for Developing Countries.

In 2023 and 2024, the Italian Coast Guard detained Sea-Eye 4 on multiple occasions:

- In June 2023 at Ortona
- On 22 August 2023 Sea-Eye 4 received a detention order – for delays in requesting a port in Salerno
- In October 2023 at Vibo Valentia
- On 7 March 2024, administrative detention of Sea-Eye 4 for 60 days was imposed by Italian authorities in Reggio Calabria

In 2025, now that NGOs were no longer allowed to pick up multiple groups of migrants during longer missions but must return to port after every rescue (under the decree by Matteo Piantedosi), the operation of the large Sea-Eye 4 was economically no longer viable and it was handed over to "Mediterranea" in May 2025, while Sea-Eye activists focused on deploying smaller vessels like Sea-Eye 5 instead.

== As Mediterranea ==
Under its new name Mediterranea, NGO activists left Italy for a rescue mission in late August 2025. After pickung up migrants and requesting a port to disembark them, the crew defied Italian authorities, who wanted them to proceed to the port of Genoa in northern Italy. The Mediterranea headed for northern Sicily instead and arrived in Trapani on 24 August 2025. A few days later the ship was seized by Italian authorities, who announced a punishment of 60 days impoundment and a fine of Euro 10,000. The sentence was aggravated by the fact that the ship, under its former name Sea-Eye 4 and under the command of captain Pavel Botica, had already been penalized for ignoring orders; the change of ownership and the new name had no mitigating effect. The activists announced their intention to appeal the sentence. A preliminary decision by an Italian court freed the ship from impoundment in mid October 2025. The judge followed the NGO´s argumentation, that the migrants on board were not in danger of dying, but in need of urgent assistance anyway. The judge wrote, keeping the ship impounded would expose the NGO to high cost for mooring fees and undermine the humanitarian goals of "Mediterranea".

On 2 November 2025 the activists picked up 65 migrants in distress south of Lampedusa. On their way back the crew of Mediterranea was directed by Alarmphone activists to an overloaded boat with another 27 migrants in need of assistance and took them on board. The organisation requested a port nearby to disembark the 92 people, citing the need for more rescue work in the area than the regular coastguard could manage. The activists again ignored coastguard orders and, instead of making the 4 day journey to Livorno to disembark the migrants, headed for the closer port of Porto Empedocle, giving the medical assessment of the migrants as justification to shorten the trip. After arrival, the port authority acknowledged that it was too dangerous to get them of the ship in open water due to the weather, so minors and women were allowed to leave first in port and the rest of the migrants were also allowed to disembark by a prosecutor later. The ship itself was again put under detention by the Ministry of the Interior for 2 month. This detention was also overturned by a judge on 11 December 2025.
