= Sarah (1986 ship) =

History
- Name: Zamba (–2023)Jersey; Sarah (2023–present) Germany
- Builder: Dunns Palm/Reigle Marine
- Laid down: 1980
- Launched: 1986
- Refit: 2023
- Homeport: Karlsruhe
- Identification: MMSI number: 211885980; Callsign: DNSX

General characteristics
- Type: REIGLE MARINE 70
- Length: 21.34 m (70 ft 0 in)
- Beam: 6.10 m (20 ft 0 in)
- Draught: 2.44 m (8 ft 0 in)
- Propulsion: 2 x MAN diesel engines with 824.32 kW (1,105 hp) each
- Speed: 20 knots (37 km/h; 23 mph)
- Complement: 12 (in 2024 SAR role)

Sarah is the name of the former motor yacht Zamba. It was renamed and refitted in 2023 to patrol rescue zones in the Mediterranean Sea.

== History ==
=== Zamba ===
Zamba was commissioned in 1986 as a motor yacht built by Reigle Marine Ltd. in Hamble, United Kingdom. The hull was made from aluminium; the deck was planked with teak. The vessel was originally built with a cabin for the owner, four guest cabins, and a cabin for the crew. It was powered by two MAN diesel engines, producing 824.32 kW (1,105.43 hp) and allowing for a top speed of 20 knots (37 km/h; 23 mph).

Zamba was auctioned off in late 2022. German national Thomas Nuding won the auction and acquired the ship for the "Search and Rescue for all Humans" (Sarah) NGO, located in Meßkirch. He intended to put together a crew of rescuers and deploy it in the Mediterranean Sea. The final price, including fees, was around 107,000 Euros.

=== Sarah ===
The ship was re-christend Sarah and transferred to Arenys de Mar in Spain, where repair and refit started in October 2023 in the "Varador 2000" shipyard. The interior was redesigned to house a cabin for up to 100 rescued individuals, a small medical station, and crew cabins. Larger fuel tanks provide longer operational range and two stainless steel davits on the stern allow the operation of a large speedboat. The hull was painted in bright orange, the superstructure is white. The ship is meant to operate with a crew of 12 and the activists chose Karlsruhe as home port, hoping to gain additional funding from the city council. In July 2024 the estimated cost for Sarah per mission was 35,000 Euros, with 20,000 Euros for fuel being the lion's share, funded by donations.

In July 2024, Sarah left Spain and headed for Sicily. In Licata she anchored next to the impounded Louise Michel. Under the command of Thomas Nuding the crew practised with the new ship and prepared to go on its first mission south of Lampedusa. Sarah picked up 19 migrants on 21 July, who claimed to originate in Syria and Palestine and allegedly had departed from Libya.

In late September 2024 the ship left Sicily again and headed for the SAR zone. Guided by activists from the Alarm Phone NGO, a craft with some 32 migrants was found 150 kilometres south of Lampedusa on 23 September. The group, including 4 women and 3 male children, were taken aboard the Sarah, which then headed to Pozzallo, where it arrived the next day. The 32 migrants apparently originated from Egypt, Syria, Sudan, Eritrea, Sierra Leone and Palestine.

In December 2025 Sarah was in need of repairs and moored in Licata, while the activists were trying to secure funding.
