= Oyvon =

History
- Name: Oyvon
- Builder: Båtutrustning
- Completed: 1996
- Renamed: 2026
- Refit: 2026
- Home port: Molde (1996)

General characteristics
- Displacement: 66 long tons (67 t) full load
- Length: 19.4 m (64 ft)
- Beam: 5.4 m (18 ft)
- Draught: 1.4 m (4 ft 7 in)
- Propulsion: 2 x 783 kW (1,050 hp) Caterpillar engine
- Speed: 38 kn (max, engine)

Oyvon is a vessel operated by the NGO Médecins Sans Frontières (MSF) since 2025 to rescue of people in distress on the Mediterranean Sea. The ship was originally built in 1996 for the health service in Norway.

The 19.4 metres (64 ft) long fiberglass boat Oyvon was put in service in late 2025 under the German (Note: one source suggests the Norwegian, rather than the German flag) flag as a replacement for the previous MSF vessel, the larger Geo Barents. Oyvon operates with a crew of 10 MSF activists, including a doctor, a nurse and an intercultural mediator.

== In Norwegian service ==
Øyvon was delivered in November 1996 and from December 1996 on, she operated as an ambulance vessel in Norway for the Helse Midt-Norge. The ships name means 'Hope for the island' in Norwegian.

In August 2021, while trying to assist Hurtigruten cruise ship Kong Harald, which had some 300 people on board at the time and had lost all engine power in a storm, Øyvon struck a reef on the Hustadvika route and took damage to her keel. The crew had to be evacuated by helicopter and Øyvon had be to be taken into tow.

On 1 September 2022 Øyvon was taken out of service with the Norwegian Health Service.

== As MSF boat ==
Now under the slightly modified name Oyvon and under a German flag, on the first mission with MSF activists in the Mediterranean Sea in November 2025 the crew rescued 27 migrants from Sub-Saharan Africa, including minors, and transported them to Italy.

On 9 September 2026 the activists picked up 24 migrants off Libyan coast. They originated from Sub-Saharan Africa and Yemen and were brought to the Italian port of Pozzallo. On 21 September 31 migrants were picked up and brought to Catania.

On 6 October 2026 the ship delivered 27 migrants, originating from Ethiopia, Eritrea, Senegal and Mali, to Reggio Calabria. On 9 October another group of 17 Sub-Saharan Africans was rescued and transported to Catania. The activist crew picked up another 65 migrants, half of which were registered as unaccompanied minors, and brought them to Augusta, Sicily on 19 October 2026. The next group of migrants, 33 people from Sub-Saharan Africa, were picked up on 31 October 2026 and transported to Reggio Calabria. After landing 8 migrants early 11 November 2026, Oyvon left Lampedusa to pick up another 50 migrants from a small boat some 50 nm east of Lampedusa. The activists were ordered to Pozzallo to disembark them.
