= Sea Punks =

German nonprofit organization

Sea Punks e. V. is a German non-profit, non-governmental organization dedicated to safe escape routes and sea rescue. The association, based in Bad Kreuznach, operates the former fishing and research vessel Sea Punk I. The organization is largely funded by donations.

== Organization ==
The association was founded in October 2019 after brothers Benjamin, Gerson, and Raphael Reschke decided, together with their friends, to do something to combat the deaths of refugees in the Mediterranean. The association organizes street teams, numbering over 200 people, who collect donations at events throughout Germany, inform people about escape routes and the association, and sell the association's merchandise.

== History ==
After its founding in 2019, in collaboration with Mission Lifeline, funds were raised to convert the Rise Above, in 2021. This was the association's first rescue ship for use in the Mediterranean. This ship has been operated by Mission Lifeline since the end of the collaboration. After the ship's conversion, the association oversaw the conversion of a shower container, which was delivered to a reception center in Greece.

In 2022, a new ship was purchased, the Sea Punk I. It was converted into a sea rescue ship in Greifswald, with the support of Medical Volunteers International e.V. After the work at the shipyard the ship stayed in Greifswald for a period, and Burriana (Spain), before entering its first deployment in May 2023.

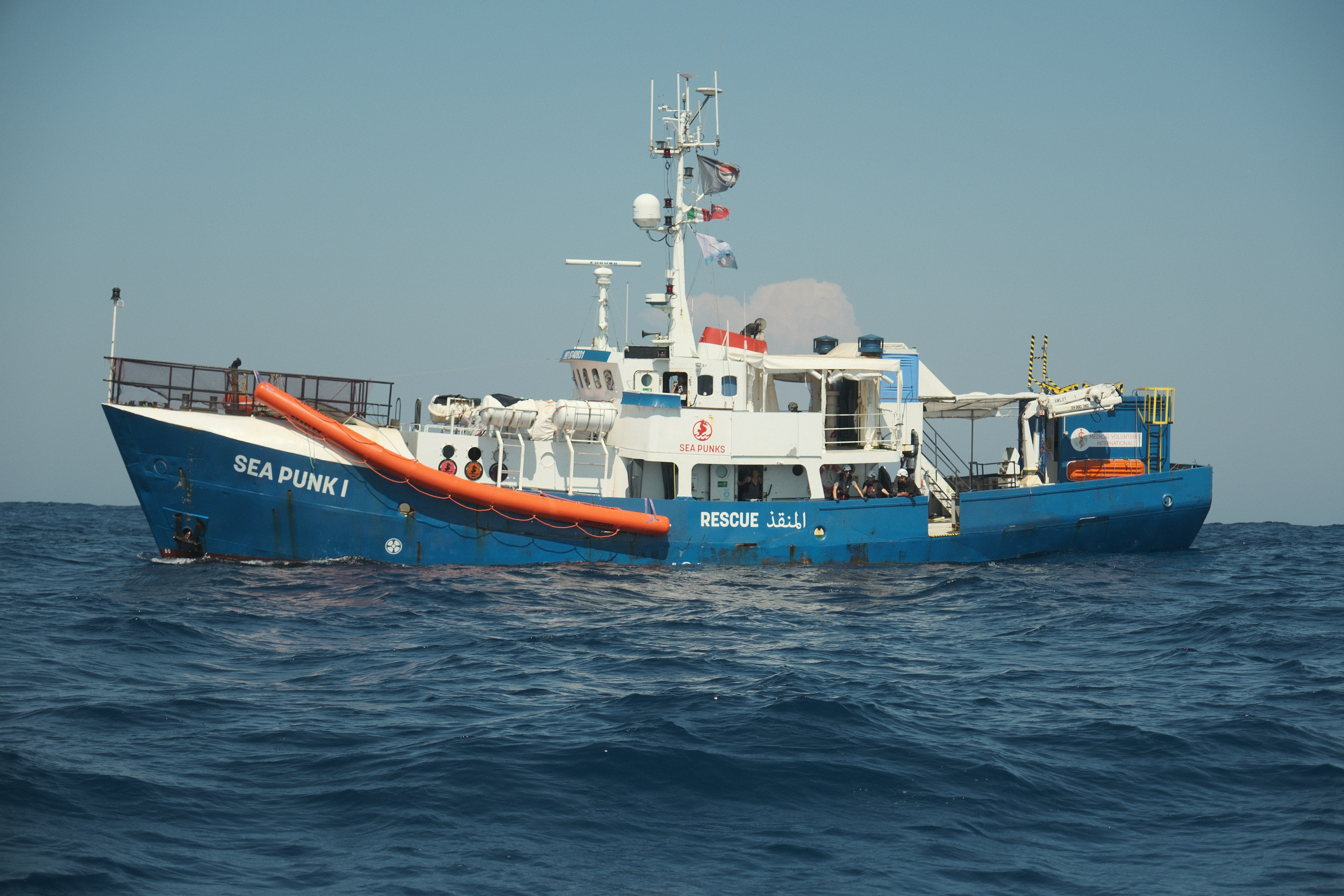
The Sea Punk I in action

== First missions ==
During the crossing into the SAR zone off the North African coast in May 2023, a leak in the oil cooler was discovered and the ship was directed to the nearest port in Palma, Spain. The Sea Punk I's deployment was aborted as a precautionary measure to allow time to remedy the deficiencies.

At the end of August 2023, the crew of the Sea Punk I set out on their second mission and reached the operational area off Tunisia at the beginning of September 2023. Shortly after arriving on site, the crew carried out two rescues in quick succession, in which a total of 83 people were brought to safety on Lampedusa with the help of the Italian Coast Guard and the organization RESQSHIP.

At the end of January 2025, an operation took place in which, partly in cooperation with the organization SOS Méditerranée, over 300 people were brought to safety from five boats. The rescue of a group of 18 shipwrecked people floating in the water, as well as the drowning of several people and the death of a small child on board the Sea Punk I, garnered international coverage.

On 13 September 2026 58 migrants were landed on Lampedusa who had departed earlier from Sabratha before being picked up by Sea Punk 1. The migrants originated in Sub-Saharan Africa and Malaysia.

== Political commitment ==
In their social media posts, the Sea Punks criticize the EU's handling of migration and accuse it of isolating itself from refugees. The association also comments critically on current political and social events. The street teams' involvement in cultural events serves to raise awareness about the situation of refugees and spread the organization's messages (e.g., Fight Racism, Save Lives).

== Financing ==
Sea Punks e. V. is financed exclusively through donations and the sale of merchandise. A variety of fundraising campaigns by various supporting individuals and institutions also contribute to the funding.
