= Alan Kurdi (ship) =

NGO-operated former German research vessel involved in Mediterranean migrant rescue

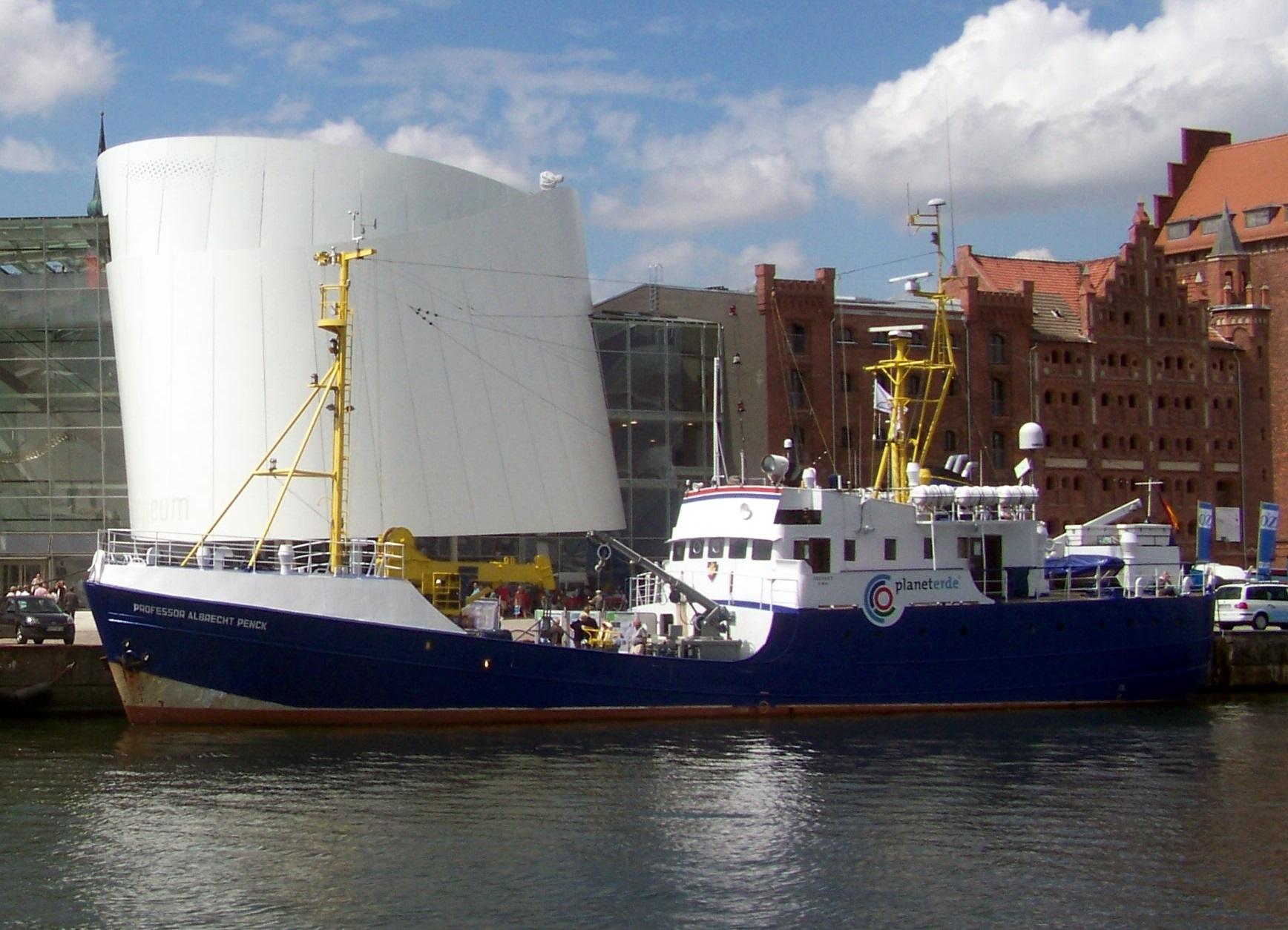
- Professor Albrecht Penck in Stralsund, 2008

History
- Name: Joh L. Krueger (1951-1960); Professor Albrecht Penck (1960-2018); Vessel for Sea-Eye (2018-2019); Alan Kurdi (2019-2021); RESQ PEOPLE (from 2021)
- Namesake: Alan Kurdi
- Builder: Sachsenberg-Werke shipyard
- Launched: 4 June 1951
- Out of service: January 2026
- Identification: IMO number: 5285667; MMSI number: 211215130

General characteristics
- Type: hydrographic vessel; rescue vessel

Alan Kurdi, named after the drowned Syrian child of Kurdish origin, Alan Kurdi, is a ship which was used from 2018 by the humanitarian organization Sea-Eye (under the German flag) and latterly (re-named ResQ-PEOPLE) by the Italian humanitarian NGO, 'ResQ - People Saving People', for the rescue of migrants in the Mediterranean Sea. Before this, she was an oceanographic vessel operated by the Land of Mecklenburg-Vorpommern, named Professor Albrecht Penck. Her IMO number is 5285667 and her MMSI is 211215130. The ship was damaged in a storm in early 2026 and the NGO decided that repair was not economically viable.

== Construction ==
The ship was built in 1951 at the Sachsenberg-Werke shipyard. She was launched on 4 June 1951 and completed in September 1951. The ship was part of a construction program for the Soviet Union's war indemnity requirements. However, the ship remained in the GDR, becoming their first research vessel.

== Use as a hydrographic vessel ==
Originally put into service as a hydrographic vessel under the name Joh L. Krueger (after mathematician Johann Heinrich Louis Krüger), the vessel was owned by the Maritime Hydrographic Service of the GDR (SHD). On January 1, 1960, the Institute of Oceanography, where Joh L. Krueger was based, was replaced by the German Academy of Sciences at Berlin. With this change, the ship was renamed Professor Albrecht Penck (after the second director of the Institute and Museum of Oceanography in Berlin).

The GDR used the ship for research trips in the North and Baltic Seas. In 1962, the first East German Spitsbergen expedition took place, with Professor Albrecht Penck, then in 1964 she was used for the first GDR expedition to the Atlantic.

After German reunification, the ship was demobilized by the dissolution of the Academy of Sciences of the GDR, which belonged to the state of Mecklenburg-Vorpommern. In 1992, the Leibniz Institute for Baltic Sea Research in Warnemünde was established. The ship, which spent around 200 days a year at sea, was now mainly used in the western Baltic Sea. She was equipped with a research winch and had four laboratories (wet, chemical, biotechnological and IT).

== Plans for educational use ==
On August 21, 2010, the vessel was decommissioned. The plan was to bring her to Stralsund and leave her at the Nautineum Stralsund museum for use. The state of Mecklenburg-Vorpommern deviated from this plan and offered the ship for sale, believing that funding for the use of the museum was not secure. She was then acquired through a tendering process by the Krebs Group, which agreed in March 2011 to cooperate with the Stralsund Ozeaneum for the use of the vessel. Subsequently, the ship was to be used in winter for "maritime education courses" and "research trips for student classes". She would also be used as a working platform for offshore wind turbine maintenance teams. The Krebs Group, which bought the vessel in 2011, used her for work on offshore wind farms and for environmental monitoring.

== Acquisition by the humanitarian organization Sea-Eye ==
In autumn 2018, the ship was sold to the non-governmental organization Sea-Eye, which used her as a rescue boat for refugees and migrants in distress in the Mediterranean Sea.

== As a rescue vessel with Sea-Eye ==
=== As Sea-Eye's third vessel ===
On 21 December 2018, she left the port of Algeciras for Libya. According to Sea-Eye, she was the first ship of a civilian relief organization to fly the German flag. On Sunday 10 February 2019, the father of the young Alan Kurdi named the ship in the presence of religious and political representatives, such as the Bishop of Mallorca Sebastià Taltavull i Anglada, in the port of Palma, on behalf of his drowned son.

=== As Alan Kurdi ===
On 3 April 2019, the Alan Kurdi rescued 64 people from a dinghy off the Libyan coast after Libyan authorities responded to radio messages. Italian Interior Minister Matteo Salvini refused to disembark the population on the pretext that the ship was flying the German flag. Activists rejected the request to travel to Germany. Due to lack of food and clean water for the three to four week trip, the refugees were brought to Malta after an agreement was reached on 13 April from where they were distributed to Germany, France, Portugal, Luxembourg and the United Kingdom.

At the beginning of July 2019, shortly after the start of a conflict between the rescue vessel Sea-Watch 3 and the Italian authorities, the crew decided to approach the search and rescue area located off the Libyan coast, with a Frankfurter Allgemeine Zeitung journalist on board. On 5 July 2019, 65 people were brought aboard the Alan Kurdi off the Libyan coast, from an inflatable boat. They came from twelve different countries, 48 from Somalia, 6 from Sudan, the others from Libya, Cameroon, South Sudan, Mali, Nigeria, Benin, Benin, Ivory Coast and Guinea-Bissau. Without a GPS-enabled phone or other navigation aid, there was apparently only ten litres of potable water left on the dinghy, which had already been at sea for 12 hours. Alan Kurdi's attempts to contact Libyan authorities as well as Italian rescue command centers were unsuccessful, according to Sea-Eye. The ship headed for Lampedusa and awaited in international waters off the Italian coast. After the Italian Ministry of the Interior had sent instructions, the vessel was refused entry to the port of Lampedusa. Alan Kurdi headed for Malta. With entry into the port of the island initially prohibited, the crew nevertheless hoped to obtain clearance to moor, in line with international aid commitments. On 7 July 2019, the ship was cleared to hand over all migrants to Maltese ships after the crew reported three medical emergencies on board.

Shortly after the ship left the waters off Malta on 8 July 2019, the crew recovered 44 people traveling on a wooden boat. They came from Libya, Syria, Palestine and Pakistan. Again, the crew had to hand the migrants over to the Maltese Coast Guard. The crew then decided to initially end their operations in the Mediterranean. Despite that, on 4 August 2019 she disembarked 40 migrants in Malta.

On April 6, 2020, during the COVID-19 pandemic, she rescued 150 migrants and headed for the Italian coast for them to be transferred to another boat which was quarantined with the support of the Red Cross.

== Change of ownership, 2021 ==
In 2021, Sea-Eye acquired another ship, the Sea-Eye 4. The organisation then passed on the smaller Alan Kurdi, to the Spanish organisation Proem-Aid. In May 2021, the vessel had been released from detention in Olbia and was reported to be headed for Burriana for scheduled maintenance.

In July 2021, the Italian humanitarian NGO, 'RESQ - People Saving People' announced that they had acquired and were preparing to start operating the Alan Kurdi, now renamed RESQ PEOPLE. Sea-Eye had sold the Alan Kurdi for 400,000 Euros; during their time operating the boat, Sea-Eye claimed it had saved 927 lives.

== As RESQ PEOPLE ==
After an extensive overhaul, RESQ PEOPLE sailed from the port of Burriana on 7 August 2021 to start a first rescue mission. On the first mission the team rescued initially 85 people, and subsequently 81 more before docking at Syracuse with 166 refugees aboard. On 15 October, at the end of their second mission, they disembarked 58 rescued persons at Pozzallo.

On 20 January 2026 the ship was caught by Storm Harry in the port of Augusta, Sicily. The vessel broke free from its mooring, ran aground and began to take on water. Activists were able to secure the ship, but later inspection showed repair was not economically viable.
