= Search and Rescue for all Humans (NGO) =

German non-governmental organisation

SARaH, or Search and Rescue for all Humans, is a German NGO based in Meßkirch whose objective is to save lives at sea, particularly in the central Mediterranean and Atlantic. It is a charitable organisation, relying on donations and fundraising events.

== History ==
=== Mediterranean missions ===
After a period chartering other vessels, since 2023 the group has operated their own ship Sarah (a 22.6 metres (74 ft) motor yacht dating from 1986) for rescuing people in danger on the Mediterranean Sea. Operations using Sarah began in July 2024.

Sarah was phased out in 2026 due to maintenance issues and will be replaced by the 14.5 metres (48 ft) steel-hulled sailing boat Thetis II in July 2026.

=== Atlantic missions ===
Regarding the Western African route, the organisation has used a chartered ship to conduct observation missions in cooperation with Mission Lifeline. SARaH's Thomas Nuding spoke of the serious issues with the increasing flux of refugees on the Western African route in 2022.

== See also ==
- List of ships for the rescue of refugees in the Mediterranean Sea
