= Sea-Eye (ship) =

The Sea-Eye is a former fishing trawler. The ship was bought by Sea-Eye e.V. in 2014 and was used as a rescue ship in the southern Mediterranean from 2015 to 2018, primarily between Malta and Libya. The ship sailed under the flag of the Netherlands. Her sister ship is the Seefuchs (described on the Sea-Eye website as identical, and built within a year of Sea-Eye), which until 2019 was also used by Sea-Eye.

== History ==
The ship was built on the Elbe shipyard (Elbewerft Boizenburg) in Boizenburg in the late 1950s. The ship was launched as the last ship of its series and was put into service on 4 May 1959 as the SAS 320 Sternhai by the owner and operator, VEB Fischfang Saßnitz. 20 of the same type of ship were initially built at the Volkswerft Stralsund and later another 30 at Elbewerft Boizenburg. The cutter has a length of 26.65 meters, which is why it was colloquially called "twenty-six". The ships' fishing area was primarily the North Sea and the Baltic Sea. In 1991 the Sternhai was bought privately and remained in the fishery until 2014.

== Use as a rescue ship ==
In the wake of the humanitarian emergency and in the face of numerous drowning people in connection with escape and migration across the Mediterranean to the EU, the non-governmental organization Sea-Eye e.V. bought the former fishing vessel, which they repaired and renamed Sea-Eye, as the first of their ships. Since 2015, after some modifications, Sea-Eye has been used for rescue operations in the Mediterranean.

The ship broke down in autumn 2018 due to engine failure and was stranded in Málaga.
