= Life (ship) =

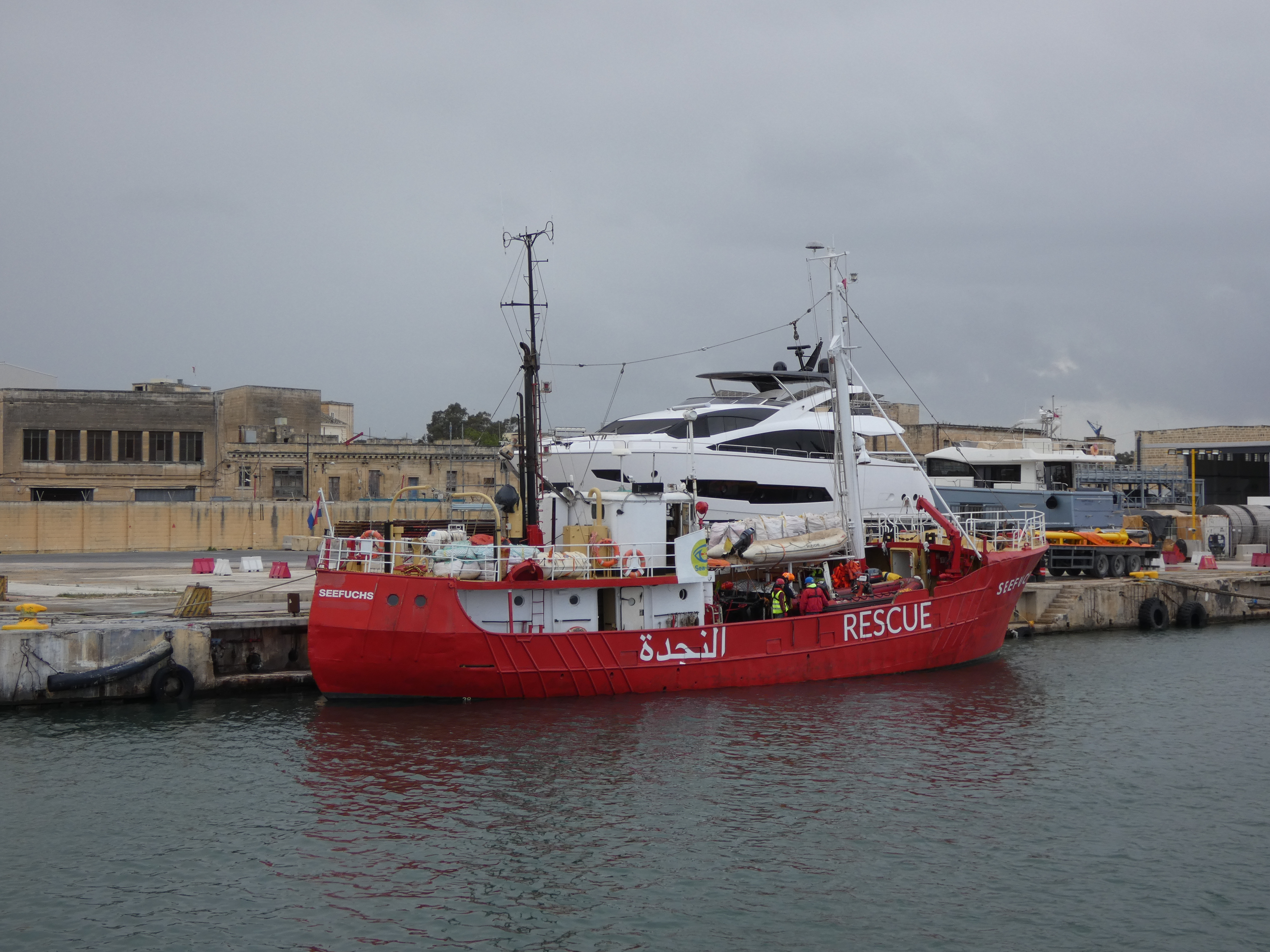
Life (then named Seefuchs) in Valletta, March 2018

The ship Life is a former fishing cutter, which was used in the Mediterranean from 2017 to 2018 under the name Seefuchs for the Sea-Eye association from Regensburg as a rescue ship between Malta and Libya. In 2019 the ship was given away to the Spanish organisation Proem-Aid. In 2021, the ship was intercepted in international waters with a large drug load after being bought by drug dealers, in a joint investigation by the Guardia Civil and the Servicio de Vigilancia Aduanera.

Before she was used as a rescue ship, the Seefuchs was based in the museum harbor in Greifswald for many years as a museum or traditional ship. Her sister ship is the Sea-Eye, which is also used by Sea-Eye. Seefuchs has the MMSI 244090482.

== History; Heringshai ==
The ship was built at the Elbewerft Boizenburg shipyard, Boizenburg and was launched in 1958. She entered service in January 1959 as SAS 316, Heringshai. The owner and operator was VEB Fischfang Saßnitz. 50 of the same type of ship were built first at the Volkswerft, Stralsund and later at Elbewerft Boizenburg. The cutter has a length of 26.50 meters, which is why it was colloquially called "twenty-six". The fishing area for the Heringshai was primarily the North Sea and the Baltic Sea. Until 1991 she was in use for commercial fishing.

== Museum ship, Seefuchs ==
In 1993 the ship was sold and renamed Seefuchs and came to the museum harbor in Greifswald as a museum ship. Since the Ryck's fairway depth was reduced in the course of the construction of the barrage in Wieck, several ships had to leave the museum harbor. For this reason, the Seefuchs came to Stralsund in 2014. There is also a film dating from this time.

== Seefuchs, Rescue ship with Sea-Eye ==
In the wake of the humanitarian emergency and in the face of numerous people drowned in connection with immigration to the EU via the Mediterranean Sea, the non-governmental organisation Sea-Eye bought the ship in 2017. After some modifications, the former museum ship was used as Sea-Eye's second ship for rescue operations in the Mediterranean until the end of 2018.

On June 21, 2018, the Italian Interior Minister Matteo Salvini (Lega Nord) announced that the Seefuchs and Lifeline of the Dresden organisation of the same name are no longer allowed to call at Italian ports. Salvini said Italy would no longer aid the "illegal immigration business" and that the organisations would have to find other ports to dock. Transport Minister Danilo Toninelli (MoVimento 5 Stelle) then announced the seizure of both ships for the purpose of a registration check, as the Representation of the Netherlands to the European Union had stated that they were not in the Dutch registers.

According to press releases, Malta announced to Sea-Eye in September 2018 that it would only authorize the Seefuchs to leave port if the association made a "strong, formal and official declaration" that it would no longer engage in search and rescue operations (SAR). On 23 November it was announced that Malta would unconditionally release the Seefuchs after six months of detention. Shortly before this, on 19 November 2018, the flag had been changed from the Netherlands to Germany.

== Life, Rescue ship with Proem Aid ==
The ship was donated to the Spanish organisation Proem-Aid in March 2019 and is to be used by the organisation under the name Life. PROEM intend to use Life for training volunteers and to raise awareness of the problems faced by refugees.

== Criminals buy the ship ==
In November 2020, a criminal organization based in Spain dedicated to drug dealing bought the ship from the NGO Proem-Aid. They moved the ship to Portimão. After preparing the ship for navigation and changing its main color to blue from red color, it travelled to the coast of Morocco, where the criminal organization proceeded to load up to 15 tons of hashish. In June 2021, in an investigation carried out by the Guardia Civil and the Servicio de Vigilancia Aduanera, the ship was intercepted 100 nautical miles south of Huelva (Spain). The ship was diverted to the Port of Huelva, where the authorities seized 15,000 kilograms of hashish and arrested its crew, made up of two Moroccan citizens, a French citizen, a Latvian citizen and a Spanish citizen. As of July 2021 the ship was interned in the port of Huelva.
