= Geo Barents =

Rescue ship, built in 2007 as research vessel

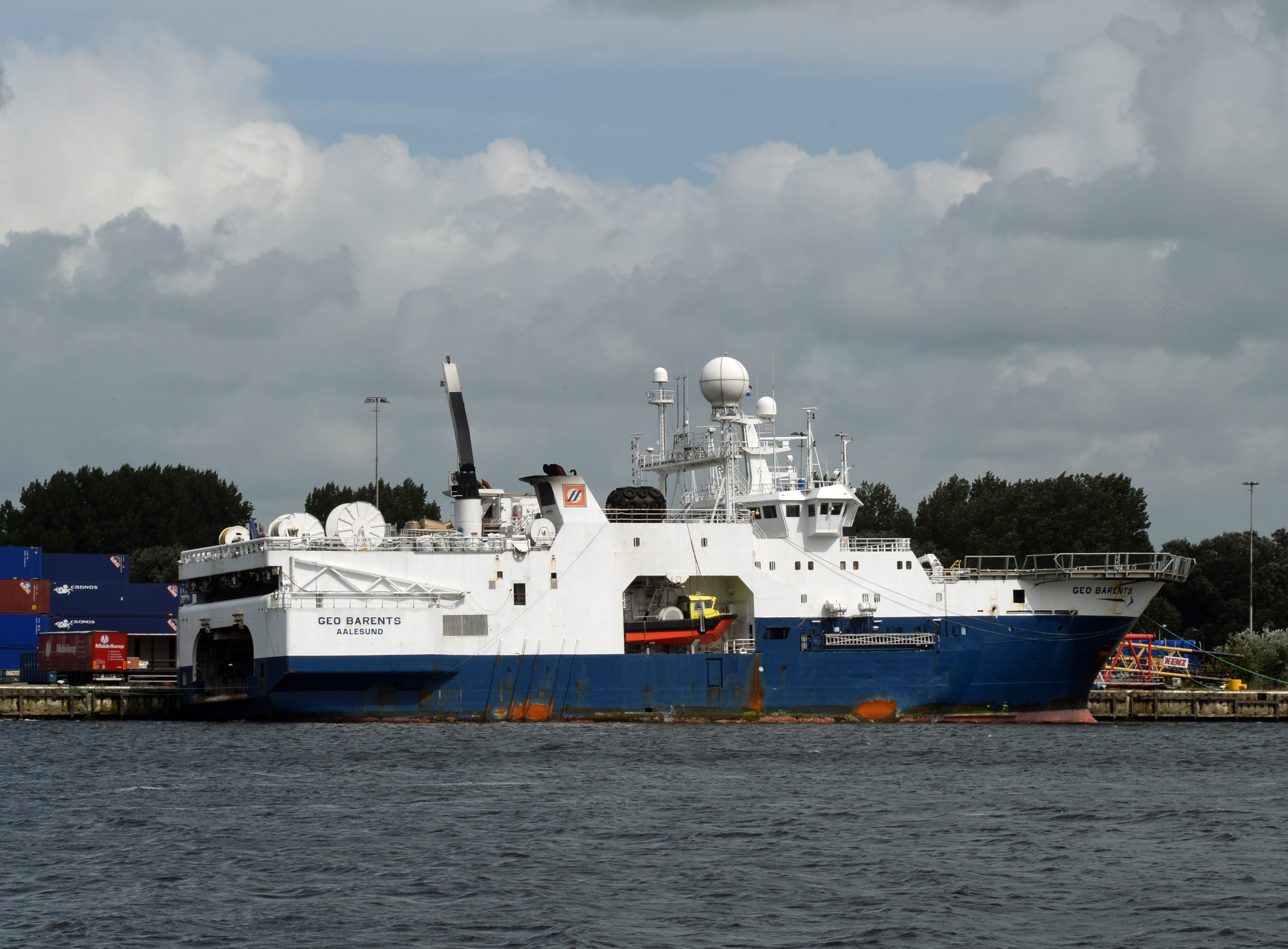
- Geo Barents in 2022

History

Norway
- Name: Geo Barents
- Owner: Uksnøy & Co AS
- Operator: Médecins Sans Frontières
- Port of registry: Ålesund
- Builder: Havyard Solstrand
- Launched: 2007

General characteristics
- Type: Rescue and salvage ship
- Tonnage: 4,979 GT; 1,293 DWT
- Length: 76.95 m (252 ft 6 in)
- Draught: 8.6 m (28 ft 3 in)
- Decks: 2 (one for men and one for women and children)
- Crew: 12 maritime crew; 20 MSF crew

Geo Barents is a rescue and salvage ship owned by Uksnøy & Co AS. She is currently chartered by Médecins Sans Frontières (MSF, or Doctors Without Borders) for sea-rescue operations of refugees in the Mediterranean since June 2021. Geo Barents is the sixth ship chartered or operated by MSF for humanitarian missions. Geo Barents sails under the Norwegian flag.

== Description ==
Geo Barents was built in 2007 by Havyard Solstrand A/S, by extending and converting the hull of a fishing trawler built in Braila in Romania. She was originally designed as a geological research vessel. The ship is 76.95 meters long with two main decks and a bridge.

Since chartering the vessel, MSF has adapted her for search and rescue. Her two decks have been adapted to create two separate accommodation sections for rescued perople: one for men, the other for women and children. The vessel has facilities for MSF teams to carry out medical assistance activities. The ship can deploy two fast rigid inflatable boats during rescue operations, and is operated by 20 MSF personnel together with typically 12 crew for maritime operations.

== Operational history ==
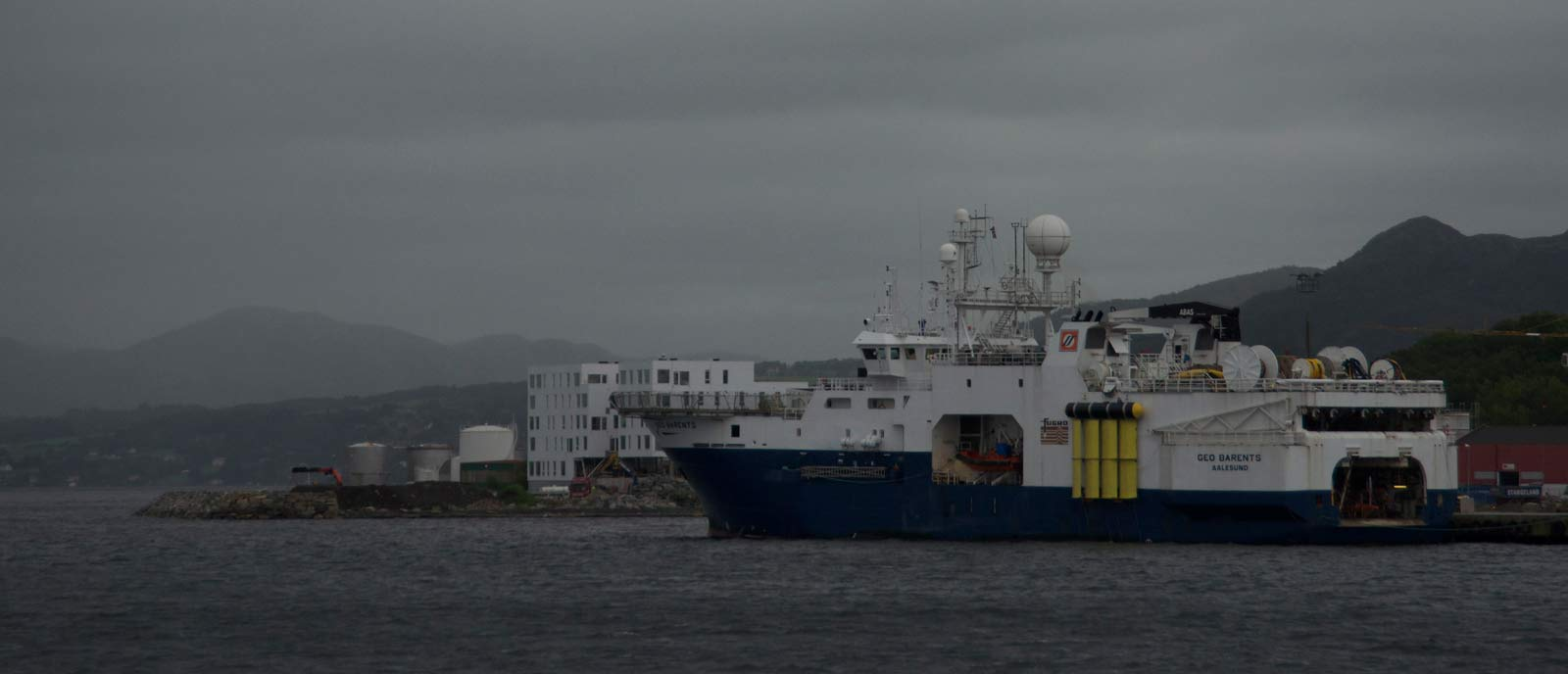
Seismic vessel Geo Barents in Stavanger, Norway in September 2012

Geo Barents operated as a research vessel studying seismic oceanography from her launch in 2007 until 2021. Initially the ship was chartered for three years to the Fugro-Geoteam company, being used for geological research for the TGS-NOPEC Geophysical Company in the Gulf of Mexico as part of the Stanley 3D project.

In 2021 she was chartered for operation for MSF.

After sailing from Ålesund in Norway on 13 May 2021, on 10 June 2021 during the first of the ship's operations MSF made their first rescue of refugees from the sea. By 14 June 2021, there were 400 aboard, who were disembarked at Augusta, Sicily on 18 June.

In December 2024 the activists announced the suspension of further operations of the vessel. During the last two years, due to bureaucratic blockages by the Italian government, it had spent some 160 days in port.

== See also ==
- List of ships for the rescue of refugees in the Mediterranean Sea
- Safeguard-class rescue and salvage ship
- ERV Nene Hatun
