= Association Pilotes Volontaires =

French charitable organization

Association Pilotes Volontaires (French: 'Volunteer Pilots Association') is a charitable NGO based in France which flies Search and rescue missions looking for refugees in danger on the Mediterranean Sea with their two reconnaissance aircraft. It was founded by José Benavente and Benoît Micolon in January 2018. Their initial aircraft, a Dyn'Aéro MCR4S, was called Colibri, and flew its first mission in May 2018.

Association Pilotes Volontaires typically operates by contacting the MRCC in Rome, rather than NGO rescue vessels directly.

As of June 2019, they had logged 52 missions, sighting 54 boats and by their estimates saving more than 4,300 people. At that date, the Association numbered 14 volunteer staff including eight pilots.

In December 2020, Association Pilotes Volontaires began operation of a second Dyn'Aéro MCR4S reconnaissance aircraft, named Colibri 2; both aircraft were still operational in December 2021.

In May 2024, the Italian Civil Aviation Authority banned NGO SAR aircraft from operating from five airports in Sicily: Lampedusa, Palermo Bocca di Falco, Palermo Punta Raisi, Pantelleria and Trapani.

From January to September 2025, Association Pilotes Volontaires carried out 41 flights, during which they observed 1,235 people who were subsequently rescued, and witnessed some 210 migrants being intercepted by Libyan authorities.

In September 2025 the Italian authorities seized the Colibri 2 for 20 days and imposed a 100,000 Euro fine on the association for failing to report refugee vessels to Libyan and Tunsian authorities as required by the "Flussi" decree-law.
