= VOS Prudence =

Offshore supply vessel

VOS Prudence is a ship originally built as an offshore supply vessel for the shipping company Vroon Offshore Services.

== Description ==
The ship was built as the first of two identical ships for the shipping company at the Fujian South East Shipyard in China. It was delivered in May 2013. The ship sails under the Italian flag and is operated by Vroon Offshore Services in Genoa.

The ship is powered by two Niigata diesel engines (type: 8L 28 HX), each with an output of 2,206 kW, which act via two azimuth thruster propeller pods. The ship is also equipped with two bow thrusters, each with an output of 650 kW. The ship has a dynamic positioning system.

Three generator sets are available for power generation, each driven by a Caterpillar diesel engine (type: C18) with an output of 450 kW. The emergency generator is driven by a Caterpillar diesel engine (type: C4.4) with an output of 80 kW.

The deck superstructures are located in the front area of the ship. The ship is set up for 50 people: 14 crew members and 36 other people. There are six single cabins and 22 double cabins available on board.

Behind the superstructure is an open, 700m² deck. The deck can be loaded with 5.5t / m^{2}. A total of 1,200t can be transported on deck. A deck crane that can lift 10t is available directly behind the deckhouse for moving loads.

== Use as a rescue ship ==
The ship was temporarily used by Médecins sans frontières Belgique for the rescue of shipwrecked migrants in the Mediterranean. The ship, which was designed as a lifeboat for 600 people after being fitted out, saved over 1,400 refugees off the Libyan coast on May 24, 2017. Since ports in Sicily were closed to the reception of refugees due to the G-7 summit taking place there, the ship had to take the rescued people onwards to Naples.

In August 2017, MSF suspended rescue operations in the Mediterranean for the time being following the announcement by the Libyan Coast Guard that it would set up its own rescue zone that would be closed to aid organisations. After the number of refugees had decreased significantly, the organisation ended the operation of its own ship in October 2017, but continued to participate in the operation of the Aquarius together with the organisation SOS Méditerranée.

In May 2021, members of VOS Prudence' crew were accused of illegally dumping rubbish into municipal waste bins in Catania in between rescue missions in 2017 and 2018.

== Sources ==
- Datenblatt, Vroon Offshore Services (PDF, 266 kB)
- Mittelmeer-Logbuch: An Bord eines NGO-Schiffes, (tr. "Mediterranean logbook: On board an NGO ship") (Kurier.at)
