= Borderline-europe =

German Human rights organization

borderline-europe - human rights without borders e. V. is a non-governmental organisation which, through independent investigations and public relations work, advocates the protection of human rights, especially at the EU's external borders. It is based in Berlin and has two branches, on the islands of Sicily and Lesbos. The organisation was founded in 2007 by Judith Gleitze, Harald Glöde, Stefan Schmidt and Elias Bierdel. In 2012 borderline-europe was awarded the Aachen Peace Prize. Its founding was at least partly a response to the 2004 case of the German rescue ship ‘Cap Anamur’ in which, after the rescue of 37 men in distress at sea, the ship's captain, Stefan Schmidt, and the organisation's chairman, Elias Bierdel were arrested and held in Italy before being acquitted, 5 years later, of aiding and abetting irregular entry.

== Tasks ==
The organisation mainly focuses on research at the External border of the European Union and on reporting on the situation on the ground. The main concern of the organisation is to strengthen a critical public for the consequences of the European policy of isolation. With their work they also oppose the widespread criminalisation of people who help refugees and migrants in need and who save lives.

The organisation :

- campaigns for legal escape routes
- campaigns against a defense by military means by Frontex against migrants
- creates research in the border regions, so-called "border monitoring"
- writes documentation / publications on the topic
- supports initiatives for humanitarian aid at the borders
- arranges contact persons for the press and organisers
- works on networking the European NGOs in the field of displacement and migration
- organises national and transnational projects, series of events and conferences

== Projects ==
=== Berlin office ===
The Berlin office supports various projects, including events against right-wing populism, participation in refugee campaigns, research projects, and cooperation with aid projects such as Alarm-Phone-Initiative, Sea-Watch and Jugend Rettet.

=== Branch office in Sicily ===
In Palermo the organisation monitors and observes conditions of refugees arriving into transit camps and when accessing the asylum procedure.

=== Branch office on Lesbos ===
A first point of contact for refugees was set up in cooperation with the local organisation "Lesvos Solidarity". Language courses, legal advice, educational offers for children and adults, psychosocial support and leisure events are to be organised here - for both refugees and the local population.

== Awards ==
In 2012 the association received the Aachen Peace Prize.
