= Mare Liberum (NGO) =

Mare Liberum is a Berlin-based human rights organisation founded in 2018. Since then, Mare Liberum e.V. has been monitoring human rights in the Aegean Sea, which is part of an escape route from Turkey to the Greek islands, on which part there are frequent drownings. The organisation runs two ships, the Mare Liberum which operates under the German flag, and the sailing yacht, Sebastian K.

On 1 May 2023, Mare Liberum was dissolved and ceased operations citing "sabotage, obstruction, and, repression" from the conservative government of Greece and a current impossibility to continue its role safely in observing the border authorities.

== Monitoring refugee events ==
The Mare Liberum association was able to document a total of 321 incidents between March and December 2020, in which 9,798 refugees were forcibly driven back to Turkey. The Greek coast guard would have been the main protagonist and, according to survivors, Frontex and NATO were also involved in some cases.

== Vessels ==
In 2018 the Mare Liberum e.V. association acquired the ship Sea-Watch, which was renamed Mare Liberum. Since then, the ship has been carrying out human rights monitoring at sea.

In 2020, Mare Liberum e.V. additionally acquired the 14.5m Beneteau sailing yacht, Sebastian K for further human rights monitoring.

The Mare Liberum was detained in port in 2019 because the German Ministry of Transport (BMVI) had changed the Ship Safety Ordinance and NGO ships that are used for humanitarian or similar purposes are now confronted with requirements in terms of construction, equipment and crew that otherwise only commercial shipping must meet. So there was a request for a corresponding ship safety certificate from Mare Liberum for Mare Liberum.

At the beginning of September 2020, the Mare Liberum was searched by Greek border guards in Perama on Lesbos. The activists themselves complained about the "criminalization of human rights work" by the Greek authorities. On September 28, the Greek police announced in a press release that 35 people and four NGOs were being investigated on Lesbos. Mare Liberum e.V. was not officially named, however. On October 2, 2020, the Hamburg Administrative Court declared the Ministry's detention order inadmissible because the Ministry of Transport had failed to inform the EU Commission of the draft of the amended regulation before it was enacted.
