= Zusammenland =

German non-governmental organisation

Zusammenland is a German NGO with the status of an entrepreneurial company with limited liability (denoted gUG -for gemeinnützige UG- (haftungsbeschränkt)), involved in the social sector, and, for a while, the operation of civilian sea rescue ships in the Mediterranean. It was founded in January 2022. The name translates literally as 'Together Land'.

== Social sector ==
Zusammenland is active in the fields of feminism and gender issues, and racial integration.

In February 2024, the group launched the media campaign #Zusammenland - Vielfalt macht uns stark/#Togetherland - Diversity makes us strong.

== Sea rescue ships ==
From May 2023 to August 2024, Zusammenland operated the 21 metres (69 ft) rescue ship MARE*GO, in conjunction with RIBs with the names GREEN (5.2 metres (17 ft)) and LEAVE NO ONE BEHIND (LNOB) (9.4 metres (31 ft)).
