= Proem-Aid =

Spanish NGO

Proem-Aid ('Professional Emergency Aid') is a Spanish NGO which operates in the Mediterranean Sea with the aims of aiding and rescuing those in distress on the water. It was formed by a group of emergency service workers who volunteered their time and expertise, and initially operated off Lesbos beginning in December 2015 before also starting an operation in the central Mediterranean in September 2017.

Proem-Aid have also been active in rehabilitation of traumatised refugees on the Canary Islands.

== Projects and vessels ==
Since 2016 the organisation has collaborated with the Sea-Watch organisation to run the LifeLine project.

Proem-Aid intend to use their ship Life (which was renamed from Seefuchs on being donated to PROEM in 2018) for training volunteers and to raise awareness of the problems faced by refugees. In November 2020 Proem-Aid sold the ship Life.

In 2021 Proem-Aid acquired the ship Alan Kurdi from the humanitarian organization Sea-Eye. As of December 2020, the Alan Kurdi had been non-operational and moored in the port of Olbia, and subject to ongoing legal proceedings, but in May 2021, the vessel was released from detention in Olbia and was reported to be headed for Burriana for scheduled maintenance. In July 2021, the Italian humanitarian NGO, 'RESQ - People Saving People' announced that they had acquired and were preparing to start operating the Alan Kurdi, now renamed RESQ PEOPLE.
