= Mare Jonio (rescue ship) =

European tugboat

The ship Mare Jonio was originally constructed as a tugboat in 1972. Operating on behalf of Mediterranea Saving Humans (MSH), Mare Jonio has been active in a Search and Rescue (SAR) role rescuing shipwrecked refugees in the Mediterranean Sea since October 2018.

The project also has the support of the German association Sea-Watch and the Spanish Proactiva Open Arms. The ship is owned by Alessandro Metz through Idra Social Shipping SRL and is managed by Augustea Imprese Marittime e di Salvataggi SpA of Genoa, Italy; Mare Jonio sails under the Italian flag.

== Specifications ==
Mare Jonio is 37m long (some sources give 38m, more specifically 37.55m in one source), with a beam of 9m and a draught of 3.2m. The ship has a maximum speed of 13knots.

== Earlier history ==
Between 2007 and 2018 the ship operated largely on the western side of Italy.

== SAR history: Selected events ==
=== 2018 ===
Mare Jonio began SAR operations by setting sail on 3 October 2018.

=== 2019 ===
Mare Jonio was seized by the Italian authorities in September 2019 over a dispute regarding the legality of landing shipwrecked refugees at Italian ports. The ship remained confiscated until February 2020, when a jury accepted Mediterranea's appeal, immediately releasing the ship from seizure.

=== 2020 ===
During March 2020 MSH announced that its two ships, Mare Jonio and Alex would suspend their navigation due to the COVID-19 pandemic. Operations resumed in June 2020, and sixty people were rescued on 19 June, followed by another forty-three on 29 June.

The ship was declared to be subject to mandatory maintenance work and has been in the port of Chioggia, Italy, since November 2020.

=== 2024 ===
The crew of Mare Jonio was attacked by the Libyan Coast Guard while conducting a Search and rescue operation in international waters, approximately 95 miles north of Libyan coastline.

== Awards ==
The Mare Jonio together with the Maersk Etienne were given the "Seafarers’ Award" 2021 at Copenhagen.
