= The AIRE Centre =

English registered charity

The AIRE Centre (Advice on Individual Rights in Europe) is an English registered charity, with offices located in London. It provides free legal advice on human rights and EU law issues in Europe, and seeks to promote the dissemination of information about international human rights law throughout Europe.

== History ==
The charity states its mission as:

To promote awareness of European law rights and assist marginalised individuals and those in vulnerable circumstances to assert those rights

Founded in 1993 by human rights lawyer Nuala Mole, it has provided advice and information to more than 8000 individuals on their rights under the two European legal orders (European Union Law and the European Convention on Human Rights). They develop their function by:

- Providing free legal advice to other lawyers and advisers in the voluntary sector
- Providing free legal advice to individuals directly
- Taking cases to the European Court of Human Rights
- Carrying out training and drafting reports and other publications

== Funding ==
The charity gains funding from various sources, including the Equality and Human Rights Commission (April 2009 to April 2012, £185,906), the Diana, Princess of Wales Memorial Fund and Comic Relief.

== Controversy ==
The charity has backed a number of controversial test cases at the European Court of Human Rights:

- In 2005 it backed convicted murderer John Hirst in his appeal to the ECtHR regarding the blanket ban on prisoners' voting rights. Since the successful ruling, AIRE have made further appeals to the ECtHR, and lobbied various parties, groups and politicians at Westminster
- In 2011, it represented Somali illegal immigrants – Abdisamad Sufi, who since entering the UK in 2003 had 17 convictions for offences including burglary, fraud, threats to kill and indecent exposure; and Abdiaziz Elmi, a drug addict with convictions for drugs and theft – against the UK Border Agency who were requesting deportation. The ECtHR ruled in favour of the two, stating that return to Somalia in light of their activities in the UK could be a violation of Article 3 (prohibition of inhuman or degrading treatment) of the European Convention on Human Rights if the pair were sent back to Mogadishu, resulting in their facing ill treatment under local Sharia law. The charity later requested and gained ECtHR legal approval to extend the arrangement to 214 other named illegal Somali immigrants.
- 2011: appealed on behalf of Nigerian national Akindoyn Akinshipe, who aged 15 attacked and raped a 13-year-old girl. Convicted and handed a four-year sentence for rape, he was advised aged 16 whilst in jail that on completion of his sentence he would be deported. Akinshipe immediately appealed the decision through both the UK and ECtHR courts process for eight years, before being arrested again aged 24 by the UK Border Agency for deportation. Held at an immigration detention centre, AIRE appealed to the ECtHR under Article 8 of the ECHR that deportation would detrimentally affect his right to "Private and Family life", which the ECtHR agreed with.
- 2013: brought test cases to the ECtHR arguing for the right of EU immigrants not to have to undergo a residency test before they can claim a host of benefits. The European Commission referred the United Kingdom to the EU's European Court of Justice in Luxembourg over the right to reside test.
