= Louise Michel (ship) =

French patrol boat

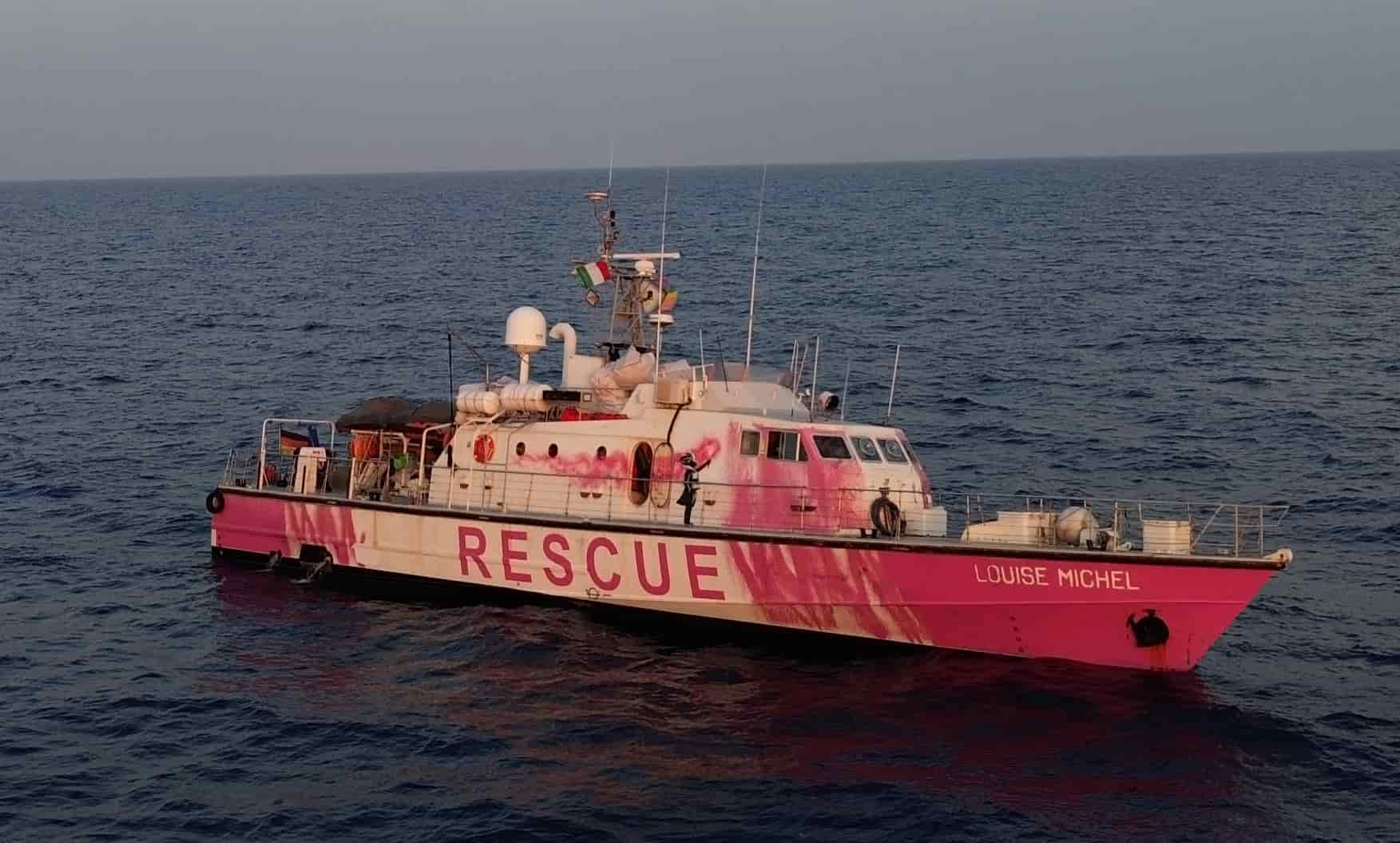

History
- Name: Suroît (1988–2020)France; Louise Michel (2020–present) Germany
- Builder: Chantier naval de l'Estérel, Cannes
- Commissioned: 1988
- Refit: 2020
- Identification: MMSI number: 211322990; Callsign: DCXD

General characteristics
- Type: Avel Gwalarn-class patrol boat
- Displacement: 67 t (66 long tons)
- Length: 30.35 m (99 ft 7 in)
- Beam: 5.80 m (19 ft 0 in)
- Draught: 1.90 m (6 ft 3 in)
- Propulsion: 2 x SACM UD23 V12 with 810 kW (1,086 hp) each
- Speed: 28 knots (52 km/h; 32 mph)
- Complement: 8 (in customs service); 10 (in 2020 SAR role)

Louise Michel is the name of the former French patrol boat Suroît, originally built for the Directorate-General of Customs and Indirect Taxes. It was refitted in 2020 to patrol rescue zones in the Mediterranean Sea.

== History ==
=== Suroît ===
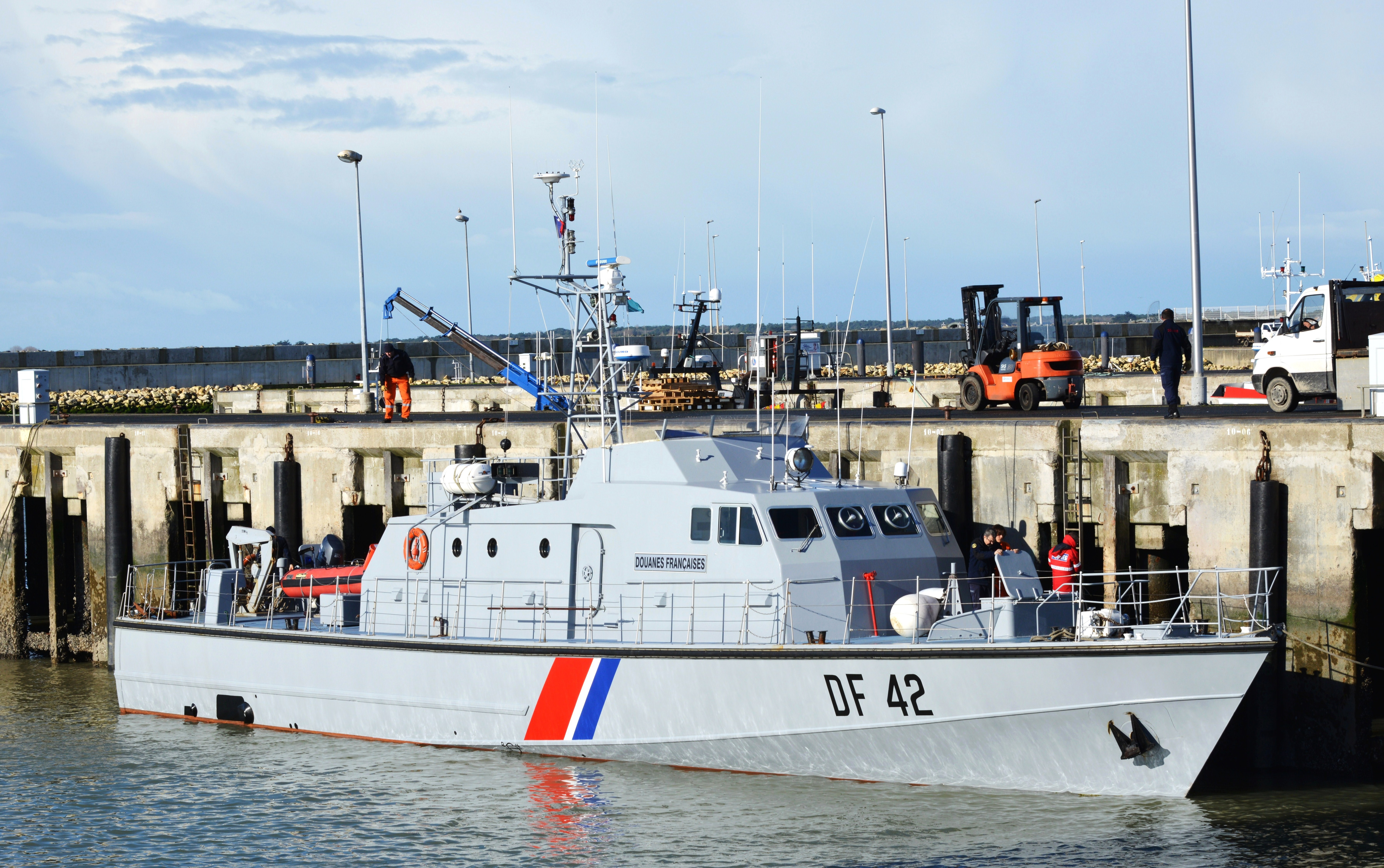
Suroit in 2014.

Suroît was commissioned in 1988 as one of two Avel Gwalarn-class patrol boats built by the Estérel shipyard in Cannes. The hull was planked with three layers of mahogany wood. The vessel was christened by French biathlete Emmanuelle Claret and put in service by the Directorate-General of Customs and Indirect Taxes with the pennant number DF 42.

The ship was stationed at the French Atlantic coast in Royan. In 2014 the crew had spent about 2,000 hours at sea, performing inspections of 150 vessels in the vicinity of the Île d'Yeu.

In July 2016 an article about the restructuring of the French customs service naval branch mentioned that Suroît would not be repaired and transitionally anchored in La Rochelle. The closing of the Royan customs brigade itself became effective on 30 September 2018.

Suroît was sold to an anonymous bidder, who intended to put together a crew of professional rescuers.

=== Louise Michel ===
The ship was transferred to Camaret-sur-Mer and activists started repair and refit in 2020 with technical assistance from SAR-Relief. They assured the public they were not planning to bring any migrant boats to Camaret-sur-Mer and claimed not to be associated with other non-governmental organizations (NGOs), but Italian media classified the group as a spin-off of the German Sea-Watch NGO.

The newspaper La Stampa associated street artist and activist Banksy with Louise Michel, citing sources and referring to artwork on the ship. Banksy had announced in 2019 that he intended to buy a rescue ship.

Financer Banksy had recruited activist and veteran NGO-captain Pia Klemp for Louise Michel's first mission, The Guardian revealed on 27 August 2020 shortly after the ship's crew had picked up 89 migrants. The crew on this first mission consisted of 10 activists, who all identify as anti-racist and anti-fascist. Other crewmembers named were Lea Reisner and Claire Faggianelli, both associated with Sea-Watch and other rescue organisations in the past.

In the summer of 2020 Louise Michel was initially docked at the Spanish port of Burriana along other NGO vessels. When the larger Sea-Watch 4 left Burriana in late August, she met with Louise Michel near the Libyan coast. The crew of Louise Michel had taken seven migrants on board. The migrants were transferred to Sea-Watch 4.

On 28 August the activists had picked up another 130 migrants, putting the crew of 10 in charge of 219 people. The crew sent out a distress call asking Italian and Maltese coast guards for help, stating on Twitter that one person was dead and Louise Michel had become disabled by a life raft towed to its side. The next day, the Italian coast guard arrived and evacuated those most in need of assistance: 32 women, 13 children and 4 men were transferred to a coast guard vessel from Lampedusa. By that time, Louise Michel's fellow rescue ships Sea-Watch 4 and Mare Ionio were also on the way to assist. After transferring all migrants over to other vessels, Louise Michel headed for the Balearic Islands, arriving in Mallorca in the first week of September. On 22 October 2020 the activists made public that they are not allowed to continue their mission, because their registration is being disputed.

In early 2022, the crew conducted several rescue operations. In March 2023, after four rescue missions in the Mediterranean, the Louise Michel brought around 180 migrants to the Italian island of Lampedusa. The ship was detained in port by Italian authorities on March 25 for violating a new law that prohibits the crew from conducting multiple rescue operations without going to port after the first one. In July 2024, the ship was detained after rescuing 37 people on the move.

Louise Michel left Spain in late June 2024, made a quick stop at the Tunisian port of Hammamet before heading to its planned rescue zone in international waters. On 1 July 2024 the crew assisted 36 migrants and was ordered by the Italian coastguard to proceed to the port of Pozzallo. Due to bad weather the crew decided to seek shelter close to Lampedusa and then asked for permission to land the migrants there. According to the activists, that permission was granted, but on 3 July Italian authorities impounded Louise Michel for deviating from disembarking at Pozzallo. For its 20 day impoundment, the ship was sent to the Sicilian port of Licata.

In June 2025, the activists entered the Libyan SAR zone and encountered a large group of 197 migrants. The majority were transferred to the Italian coastguard and brought to Lampedusa, but the final batch of 46 migrants from the group were picked up by Louise Michel. The ship was ordered to bring them to Crotone – a 40-hour trip. The activists landed 23 migrants from Eritrea, 18 from Pakistan, 3 from Somalia and 2 Bangladeshis in Crotone.

On 5 Juni 2026 47 migrants, who had been picked up the day before, were brought to Crotone. They mostly originated from sub-saharan Africa.

Louise Michel was approached by a fast moving craft off the Libyan coast on 21 July 2026 which abandoned 6 Iranian migrants in the sea before it disappeared. The activists picked them up and requested a port to disembark them. Italian authorities assigned Catania, but the crew claimed it was too far away because they were short on fuel, so they were assigned Pozzallo instead. The Italian Guardia di Finanza checked the fuel upon arrival in Pozzallo and judged that there had actually been enough fuel in Louise Michel`s tanks to reach Catania; they concluded the activists had given false information to the Italian authorities and the ship was impounded on 26 July for 20 days and the NGO was fined 10,000 Euros.

On 27 August 2026 the ship closed in on a reported emergency, joined by the "Seabird" surveillance aircraft. The boat in distress, carrying migrants, was approached by a Libyan coastguard vessel at the same time and two migrants fell overboard when Louise Michel closed in on them. The activists claimed the Libyans then fired two shots at Louise Michel. The ship was not hit and nobody was injured. 42 migrants were picked up during the trip and Italian authorities assigned the port of Crotone for disembarkation. The migrants, mostly from Somalia, were disembarked on 29 August. On 18 October 2026 the activists landed 40 migrants from sub-saharan Africa in the Italian port of Reggio Calabria. 9 of the migrants were registered as unaccompanied minors. On 14 November 2026 the activists landed 53 migrants in Reggio Calabria. The migrants originated mostly from sub-saharan Africa and Egypt.
