= Sea-Watch 3 =

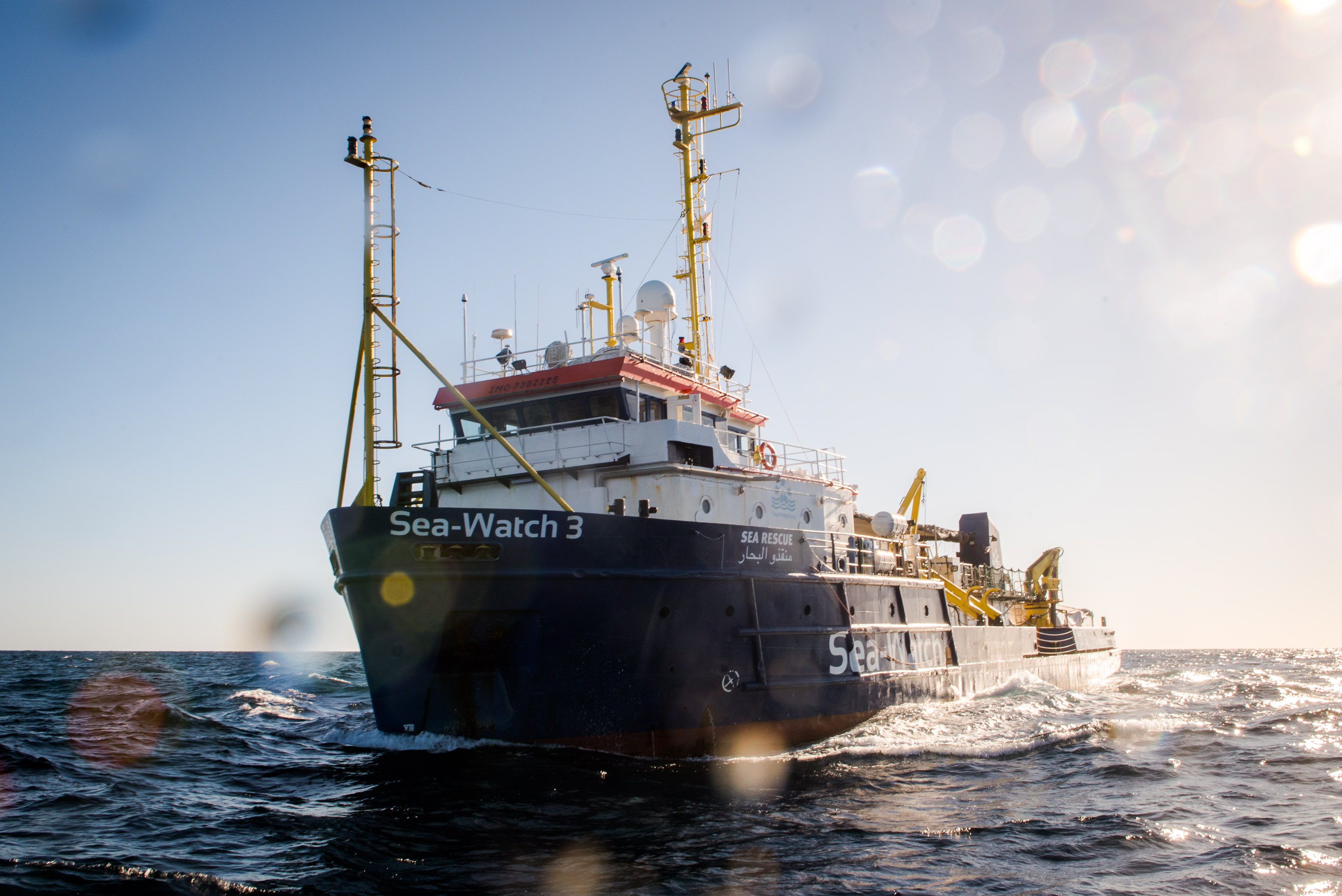
Sea-Watch 3

Sea-Watch 3 is a ship of the Sea-Watch organization based in Berlin. The ship is around 50 m long, and is registered as a Cargo Ship in Germany. Sea-Watch 3 is used for sea rescue in the Mediterranean.

== Description ==
The ship is powered by two Caterpillar (type: D399TA) four-stroke sixteen-cylinder diesel engines with a total output of 1630 kW, which act on two fixed propellers via reduction gears. This gives a speed of around 10 kn. The ship is equipped with a bow thruster.

Two generator sets with 156 and 184 kVA apparent power are available for power generation, which are driven by a Detroit diesel and a Caterpillar diesel engine.

During service as Furore G, the ship was operated by eight crew members who were accommodated in individual cabins. There was also space for seven other people in three double and one single cabin.

Sea-Watch 3 is the successor to Sea-Watch 2 (2016-2017) and the original vessel named Sea-Watch (2015).

== History ==
The ship was built under construction number 211 by Shimoda Dockyard in Japan as an offshore supply vessel. The keel was laid in 1972. The ship was sold to Petroleiro Brasileiro S.A. in early July 1973. Petrobras Frota Nacional de Petroleiros in Rio de Janeiro put the vessel into service as Alegrete. In 1982 it was sold to Companhia Brasileiro de Offshore in Salvador.

In 1990 the ship was sold to Sunset Shipping in Douglas on the Isle of Man and converted into an offshore safety ship. The ship's new name was Seaboard Swift.

In the second half of the 1990s it was sold and renamed several times: in 1995 it came to Hornbeck Shipping in Douglas and was renamed Hornbeck Swift, in 1997 as Swift to Tidewater Marine (Northsea) in Den Helder and in 1999 to Rederij West Friesland in Den Heroes who renamed it Swift 1. The Rederij West Friesland had it converted into a support ship for seismic research at the Frisian Shipyard in Harlingen.

In 2004 the ship came to Telco Marine in Den Helder, but a few months later it came to Vroon Offshore Service. The ship's new name was VOS Southwind. In 2010 the ship was sold to Rederij Groen and renamed Furore G at the end of the year. The Rederij Groen used the ship as an offshore support ship.

== Use as a rescue ship ==
=== Dignity I ===
In 2015 the ship was sold to Doctors Without Borders Spain (Médicos Sin Fronteras España) in Barcelona. The non-governmental organization used it as Dignity I for the rescue of refugees in the Mediterranean.

=== Initial operations as Sea-Watch 3 ===
In 2017, the Sea-Watch Association took over the ship, replacing the smaller Sea-Watch 2. Pia Klemp was a short-term member of the crew.

On 6 November 2017, several people died in an incident at sea. They fell or jumped into the water when the Sea Watch 3 and a Libyan boat got in each other's way while rescuing castaways.

In June 2018, the ship was arrested by the Maltese authorities in the port of Valletta because it was allegedly not properly registered under the Dutch flag. Although the proper Dutch registration had already been clarified in July, the Sea-Watch 3 was refused permission to leave Valletta until October for political reasons. In December 2018, Sea-Watch filed a lawsuit against the Maltese Ministry of Transport for arbitrarily preventing the Sea-Watch 3 from being freely available.

== Legal dispute over port access in Italy ==
=== January 2019 ===
In January 2019, Italy refused to allow the Sea-Watch 3 to enter one of its ports with several rescued people on board, as the nearest safe port to the rescue location was in Tunisia. Ten days after the rescue of the 47 people, in response to a lawsuit by the captain of Sea Watch 3 and several rescued people on board, the European Court of Human Rights decided that Italy had to provide the people on board with food and medical care. The minors on board must also be provided with legal assistance. The applicants had actually requested that the migrants be allowed to leave the boat. The court did not comply. A little later it became known from those around the Italian government that representatives of Germany, France, Portugal, Romania and Malta had agreed to accept the people.

=== May 2019 ===
In mid-May 2019, the crew of the Sea-Watch 3 rescued 65 people, 60 kilometers off the Libyan coast. The Italian Minister of the Interior, Matteo Salvini, issued a ban on sailing into Italian territorial waters. A little later, the injured and their families were taken in, 18 people went ashore in a coast guard boat. The ship itself remained outside Italian waters, 15 nautical miles from Lampedusa. According to the activists, some of the remaining 47 people then considered suicide if they were not brought ashore as well. Finally, on 18 May, despite the ban, the crew headed for Italian territorial waters. Humanitarian reasons as well as the psychological condition of the "guests" compelled this and the boat claimed the right to call at the next safe haven. The people were brought ashore off Lampedusa by the Italian coast guard and the Guardia di Finanza. The ship was confiscated as a precaution. Salvini demanded the ship's decommissioning and sinking. He accused the public prosecutor who ordered the landing of "aiding and abetting illegal immigration to Italy". The interior minister threatened to take action against anyone who did such a thing. On 1 June 2019, the ship was released again by the authorities. Subsequently, the chairman of the council of the Evangelical Church in Germany, Heinrich Bedford-Strohm, visited the ship, which was not yet docked, to express his support for the crew.

=== Confiscation, summer 2019 ===
The Sea Watch 3 with twenty-two crew members and two employees of the NDR, including Nadia Kailouli, on board, saved 53 people from Libya. According to the crew's guest coordinator, there were thirty-eight men, nine women, three unaccompanied minors and three children, most of them from Ivory Coast or Ghana, some from Mali, Guinea, Egypt and Libya. First ten, and later another three people were brought ashore to Italy, mostly for medical reasons, while forty (thirty-two men, six women and two unaccompanied adolescents) remained on board while the ship entered Lampedusa without a permit. Interior Minister Matteo Salvini described the ship as a pirate ship. The United Nations High Commissioner for Refugees and the International Organization for Migration appealed to European states to take in the rescued. On June 21, Captain Rackete and several nationals from various African countries applied to the European Court of Human Rights for an interim order to force Italy to allow the ship to enter. However, the court rejected the urgent application on 25 June 2019, as provisional measures are only provided if there is an "immediate risk of irreparable damage". The situation on board the ship currently did not justify any coercion against Italy. Italy was informed that the court was relying on the necessary help from the authorities in relation to "those in the situation of vulnerability".

On 26 June 2019, the ship entered Italian territorial waters despite the threat of high fines, because after two weeks on the ship the migrants “couldn't take it anymore” and “some threatened to jump overboard”. Salvini called on the judiciary to act quickly and said that Italy was not a "landing stage for illegals". "It is a Dutch ship from a German non-governmental organization that has taken in migrants off Libya." According to Salvini, nobody understood why Italy and its citizens should be responsible for it and should pay for it. The ship was stopped by the coast guard. Several Italian MPs then stayed overnight on the ship out of solidarity.

The Archbishop of Turin, Cesare Nosiglia, meanwhile offered that his church could look after the people without burdening the state. In addition, several German cities had also agreed to accept them. For this, however, the approval of the federal government would be necessary, because the federal government assumes around 90% of the costs for accommodation and living costs of the admitted refugees. The mayor of the Sicilian capital Palermo, Leoluca Orlando, made the ship's crew honorary citizens.

On the night of 29 June the captain surprised the security forces with a mooring manoeuvre in the port of Lampedusa. A state patrol boat tried to prevent this and was pushed against the pier. A Sea-Watch spokesman justified the action with: “It was the last desperate attempt to ensure the safety of the people.” However, a political solution for the migrants had already been agreed at that time: Several EU states, including Germany, had offered to take in those seeking protection. Italy's Interior Minister Salvini, however, demanded appropriate guarantees, without which the ship would not have been allowed to land. A few hours after the mooring manoeuvre, the rescued migrants were allowed to go ashore. The arrested captain faced a fine of up to 50,000 euros for violating the port and water closures and between three and ten years in prison for resisting and using violence against a warship. The Interior Minister announced that if she was not convicted, she would be deported for endangering national security.

The house arrest was lifted on July 2 by an investigating judge in Agrigento. According to the MDR court ruling of the regional court, the judge ruled that the obligation to rescue at sea according to international maritime law should be assessed more strongly than the legal regulations in Italy that were changed by Interior Minister Salvini. The captain acted “in the fulfillment of a duty”. The extent of the collision with a boat of the Guardia di Finanza moored on the quay wall was exaggerated. Rackete was relieved. After the judge was verbally attacked by the media and Salvini, the Italian judges' association ANM accused Salvini of nurturing a climate of hatred and aversion. The UN human rights experts of the UN Human Rights Council condemned the criminalization of sea rescue and the intimidation of the independent Italian judiciary by the media and Salvini on July 18. The judicial decision aligned with the established international legal norms on sea rescue. On 25 September 2019, the Agrigento public prosecutor's office reimposed the seizure of the ship in order to preserve evidence. The ship was not allowed to sail because it would have violated the security decrees issued by Salvini. In mid-December, a court in Palermo released the Sea Watch 3 so that it could leave the port of Licata at the end of 2019 and resume sea rescue operations.

In February 2026 a court in Palermo sentenced the state of Italy to reimburse all costs incurred by the NGO in connection with the seizure of Sea Watch 3. According to the verdict, port fees, fuel cost and legal fees amount to some 76,000 Euro.

== 2020 ==
On 9 January 2020, the activists took in two groups of 59 and 17 migrants, and on 10 January another 42 people who had previously requested rescue via the Alarm-Phone-Initiative were added. According to the Maltese military, the people taken on board from Sea Watch 3 and 118 people from the Open Arms were to be taken over by Maltese ships on 11 January and transported ashore. On 14 January, Italy assigned Taranto as a safe port of disembarkation for Sea-Watch 3. The berthing in Taranto took place on 16 January and all the 119 rescued people went ashore.

On 25 February, the activists picked up 194 migrants from three boats off the Libyan coast and then motored towards Italy. Because of the COVID-19 pandemic, the President of the Sicily Region, Sebastiano Musumeci, called for the migrants on board to be quarantined. The measure was ordered the following day, as on the Ocean Viking, and both the crew and the migrants remain quarantined on land for two weeks.

In mid-March 2020, the ship could not leave the shipyard in Messina because spare parts were missing and further, as a result of the COVID-19 pandemic, a crew could not be put together due to travel restrictions.

The ship left again on 7 June 2020, and on 17 June the activists reportedly recovered 100 migrants 29 nautical miles from Az-Zawiya. Later that day, 65 more were added, followed by 46 the next day. They were apparently part of a larger operation in which Libyan and Tunisian people smugglers sent around 600 people in various boats towards Italy within a few hours. The majority are said to have been intercepted by the Libyan coast guard. The 211 migrants were quarantined on a ferry in Porto Empedocle on 21 June. A migrant who had already shown symptoms when landing tested positive for the coronavirus by the Italian authorities, who then ordered the activists to be quarantined.

=== Opinions from experts on the law of the sea ===
Nele Matz-Lück, professor of public law with a focus on the law of the sea at Kiel University, sees a legal gap in the conventions on the law of the sea. The coastal states are not automatically obliged by their sovereignty to let rescued persons ashore, but could instead provide them with medical care on board, for example.

Valentin Schatz, Chair of International Maritime Law at the University of Hamburg says that Italy should have assigned a port. A return of refugees to Libya would be illegal, so it is understandable to head for the nearest port of Lampedusa. The ship is not designed for a further non-stop voyage to its flag state of the Netherlands. "The law is somewhat more on the part of the NGO, but ultimately the international law of the sea does not regulate how this situation is to be resolved".

=== 2021 ===
From 26 to 28 February 2021, after a seven-month break, the Sea-Watch 3 rescued 317 people from drowning off the Libyan coast. A week earlier, the ship had left the port of the Spanish city of Burriana to patrol the Libyan coast.

The Italian coast guard interned the Sea-Watch 3 on 21 March in Augusta. The ship was heavily overloaded when 363 shipwrecked people were rescued on 3 March and had violated regulations when entering Augusta and the crew had contaminated port facilities with hydraulic oil from a crane. During the ship inspection, deficiencies in fire and environmental protection measures were found. A spokeswoman for SeaWatch stated that the allegations were already known from the last internment and were politically motivated.

After some four months of maintenance and repairs, Sea-Watch 3 was able to resume its deployment at the end of July 2021. At the end of December 2021, the ship with 440 migrants aboard was assigned the port of Pozzallo in southern Sicily. According to the crew, more than 200 children and teenagers were on the ship, of which 167 were without parents or other adult companions. They had tried to get to Italy from Libya by small boats across the Mediterranean. Permission to disembark was preceded by a waiting period of days. Health-weakened people had already been brought off board before entering the port.

=== 2022 ===
On 24 September 2022, the ship was detained in the Italian port of Reggio Calabria, having previously brought 427 migrants ashore. According to Sea Watch, the authorities’ accusation is that too many migrants and refugees would have been brought on board.

== Decommissioning ==
In May 2023, Sea-Watch 3 was shut down, scrapped and recycled at the Galloo shipyard in Ghent, Belgium. She was the flagship of Sea-Watch and had sailed in the Mediterranean for six years in the service of sea rescue. Sea-Watch have a new ship, Sea-Watch 5, which has been rebuilt and expanded in Flensburg for rescue missions.

== Film ==
Sea Watch 3: NDR documentary by filmmakers Nadia Kailouli and Jonas Schreijäg. They accompanied the Sea Watch 3 on the rescue voyage in June 2019 for 21 days until Carola Rackete was arrested. The film was awarded the Grimme Prize 2020.
