= RESQ-People =

Italian NGO

ResQ-People Saving People is an Italian NGO with the aim of improving the lot of refugees and migrants attempting to cross the Mediterranean Sea to Italy. It was formed in Milan and from an early stage aspired to support a rescue ship sailing off the Italian coast.

Among the organisation's staff is Cecilia Strada.

The organisation acquired the vessel Alan Kurdi (formerly the oceanographic vessel Professor Albrecht Penck) in July 2021 and renamed the ship Resq People; it began operating on rescue missions on 7 August 2021. That month, in one operation it brought 166 rescued people to Sicily.

On its first mission, ResQ People rescued initially 85 people, before docking at Syracuse with a total of 166 refugees aboard. On 15 October 2021, ResQ People disembarked 58 rescued persons at Pozzallo at the end of its second mission.
