= RESQSHIP =

German charity

RESQSHIP is a German charitable Non-Governmental Organisation based in Hamburg, with further branches in Freiburg, Mainz and Augsburg. It was founded in 2017.

The organisation received financial support from the German government after the Scholz cabinet had been elected in 2021. In 2024 the government gave 111,728 Euro to Resqship.

== Yacht Josefa ==
From 2019 to 2021, Resqship operated the 14-metre (46 ft) sailing yacht Josefa, primarily to observe and monitor the situation off the Libyan coast. However, on occasion the Josefa was in such a position as to need to carry out rescues herself. Typically, as she is a relatively small yacht, in such cases onward transfer to a larger vessel was arranged as soon as possible after the initial rescue. Josefa is named for a woman rescued from the sea by the NGO Proactiva Open Arms.

According to Resqship, during 2019 the Josefa carried out nine rescue missions.

== Yacht Nadir ==
In May 2021 Josefa was replaced with a newer and larger (18-metre (59 ft)) ketch, the Nadir. Although some sources mention a schooner, this is clearly contradicted by pictures of Nadir showing her to have ketch rig. Resqship resumed operations in June 2021 with the Nadir.

In August 2021, the Nadir took part with other vessels in the rescue of some 800 refugees from unseaworthy craft. In April 2023, the Nadir rescued 47 persons from an overcrowded steel boat at risk of sinking, after standing by to assist 54 others on a wooden vessel the previous night.

In June 2024, Resqship's Nadir saved 52 people on one vessel near Lampedusa. Resqship reported that on 31 July 2025, one day after release from detention, Nadir rescued 48 persons from drowning. In August 2025, the Nadir was involved in the rescue of 65 refugees during an event where a further three died.

The activists carried out additional operations, picking up 5 migrants who originated from Ethiopia with the Nadir on 17 September 2026. An additional 53 migrants, originating from Bangladesh, Egypt, Pakistan and Syria, were picked up by the activists on 3 October 2026 from the abandoned "Didon" oil platform and brought to Lampedusa. An additional 8 migrants were brought to Lampedusa on 8 October 2026.

On 1 November 2026 the activists picked up eight migrants near Lampedusa who claimed to have been thrown into the sea by smugglers 20 minutes before. They were registered as originating from Afghanistan, Bangladesh and Pakistan. A further group of migrants was brought in on 5 November 2026. 37 migrants, all originating from Sub-Saharan Africa, were landed in Lampedusa.
