= Sea-Eye =

German sea rescue and refugee aid organization

Sea-Eye is a German non-governmental organization headquartered in Regensburg. It participates in the rescue of migrants in distress in the Mediterranean, in particular by chartering and operating ships for the rescue of refugees at risk in the Mediterranean.

== History ==
Sea-Eye was founded by Michael Buschheuer in Regensburg in 2015. The activists depend on donations, most notably by German Christian churches and their followers.

Sea-Eye operated the Sea-Eye and Seefuchs/ Sea Fox until August 2017, then the Alan Kurdi (named in memory of the young Syrian found drowned on a Turkish beach in 2015) and from August 2020 to 2025 the Sea-Eye 4. In June 2021, Sea-Eye received honorary citizenship from the mayor of Palermo. In 2024, together with United4Rescue, Sea-Eye bought the NIS RANDERS, a former German Sea Rescue Society boat, which they now operate in the Mediterranean as Sea-Eye 5.

== Operations ==
On 3 April 2019, the Alan Kurdi, alerted after a call to the emergency number of the (German) Watch the Mediterranean Sea association, rescued 64 migrants (including twelve women and two children aged one and six) off the Libyan coast; Italy and Malta initially refused berthing but after ten days of waiting at sea, the migrants were finally permitted to disembark at the port of Valletta and were divided between Germany, France (twenty of them), Portugal and Luxembourg.

On 5 July 2019, off the coast of Libya, Sea Eye rescued 65 migrants from drowning. On 7 July 2019 65 migrants were disembarked from Alan Kurdi in Naples.

On 4 August 2019 Alan Kurdi disembarked forty migrants in Malta.

Under the Scholz cabinet (2021-2025), the activists managed to secure financial support from the government, resulting in 2 million Euros in 2024 and 900.000 Euros in the first half of 2025 for Sea-Eye and other German based migrant-rescue-NGOs. The funding ended in the second half of 2025 under the new administration.

In 2025 the operation of Sea-Eye 4 was deemed economically no longer viable under the Piantedosi-rules and it was handed over to "Mediterranea".

On 15 June 2025 the activists picked up 65 migrants some 50 miles off the Libyan coast. The Sea-Eye 5 requested a harbor from Italian authorities to disembark the migrants, some of whom were in need of medical assistance. The ship was directed to Pozzallo in Sicily to hand over the injured migrants and then to proceed to Taranto for the rest. The crew decided that Taranto was too far away, and they did not want to triage the migrants, so they headed to Pozzallo with all migrants instead, where the ship was impounded for disobeying orders.

In late July 2025 the activists on Sea-Eye 5 picked up another 31 migrants in two sorties. Two migrants were evacuated to shore in advance, the rest was brought to Vibo Valentia.

In September 2025 Sea-Eye 5 picked up 52 migrants who had called for support using the Alarmphone initiative. The Sea-Eye activists' protests were disregarded by the Italian authorities and they were assigned the distant port of Brindisi to disembark the migrants. Forcing them on a 40 hour journey in the crowded boat. The migrants arrived on 9 September and allegedly originated from Egypt, Eritrea and Somalia.

== Documentaries ==
On behalf of Sea-Eye and other sea rescue and civil society organizations two documentaries have been produced: Route 4 (2021) and Kein Land für Niemand (2025).
