= Alarm-Phone-Initiative =

Project committed to the sea rescue of refugees

The Alarm-Phone-Initiative (Also known as: Watch The Med Alarm Phone Project) is a project operated since 8 October 2014 by volunteers from Europe, Tunisia and Morocco, which is committed to the sea rescue of refugees. The 'Alarm-Phone-Initiative' website provides a web resource to help refugees in need of rescue at sea, while the 'Watch The Med' website monitors and summarises events involving refugees in the Mediterranean.

== History ==
The initiative emerged from the "Watch The Med" project, which the activists Lorenzo Pezzani and Charles Heller of "Forensic Oceanography" founded in 2012 to document escape stories and accidents in the Mediterranean. Based on the experience gained and inspired by the initiative of Eritrean Mussie Zerai, who had set up his own helpline for migrants on the way to Europe, the initiative was announced in mid-2014 and officially started on October 8, 2014, with the help of donations. The date was set on the anniversary of the 2013 disaster when over 260 Syrians drowned off Lampedusa after the Italian and Maltese coast guards had avoided responsibility for days.

The Alarm Phone Initiative justifies its work stating that coast guards are said to have repeatedly ignored emergency calls in the past and the intergovernmental cooperations Frontex and Triton did not practice sea rescue, but carried out military defensive actions.

== Functionality ==
According to estimates from 2017, around 120 activists in 12 countries were working for the Alarm Phone Initiative to answer emergency calls at any time. If necessary, foreign language experts can be called in.

The initiative has set up a hotline for refugees in distress at sea (+334 86 51 71 61), with activists distributing the phone number in refugee camps and on the Internet, through refugee organizations, migrant communities and social media. The employees work on a voluntary basis and operate locally from home.

Since the smugglers often give the refugees a Thuraya telephone or they have a mobile phone themselves, they are encouraged to first contact the coast guard and also the alarm phone hotline in the event of an emergency on board. Many emergencies are also reported via WhatsApp. The employee of the Alarm Phone Initiative then forwards the coordinates and further information on the emergency to the appropriate coast guard or the international refugee agency UNHCR. Alarm Phone Initiative then observes the reactions of the coast guard and documents the progression of every emergency from the emergency call to the rescue. If, despite repeated reminders, the employees “have the feeling that they will not be rescued immediately”, the Alarm Phone Initiative tries to put pressure on the coast guards and politicians with a message that is distributed via mailing lists. In addition, the activists try to fill the satellite telephones on board the refugee ships with money in order to be able to guarantee the functionality of these. These funds are also used in so-called push-back campaigns.

== Requirements ==
The Alarm Phone Initiative primarily blames the European Union and its member states for refugee deaths in the Mediterranean. After it became known at the end of May 2016 that the state MRCC sea rescue center in Rome was apparently being informed continuously and in good time by Italian liaison officers in North Africa about the departure times and locations of refugee boats, a spokesman for the initiative pointed out that this was not known to Watch The Med until then. Further, with this information it should be easy to identify the three routes, which, due to there being only three places in Libya from which boats leave, have to be monitored from the air and thus come to the aid of people in good time. Hagen Kopp, a co-founder of 'Watch the Med', called this fact a calculated and monitored death.

The activists had already asked in an open letter in April 2016 that all refugees be evacuated from Libya by ferry to Europe, where they should be granted unconditional protection without being subjected to an inhumane asylum procedure that has lost its original purpose and become only one another means of exclusion.

== Projects ==
As part of the Afrique Europe Interact group, Alarm Phone Initiative tried to set up another emergency call centre in Agadez in Niger in December 2017, which aims to rescue people on their way to Europe travelling through the desert towards Libya, as an initiative called "Alarmphone Sahara".

== Successes ==
In April 2015, the Alarm Phone Initiative forwarded to the Maritime Rescue Coordination Center (MRCC) in Rome the coordinates of a ship from Zuwara that was in danger of sinking.

== Awards ==
On September 19, 2015, the Watch the Med Alarm Phone Initiative was awarded the Panter Prize after a vote by the readers of the daily newspaper Die Tageszeitung (taz).
