= Sea-Watch =

German non-governmental organisation

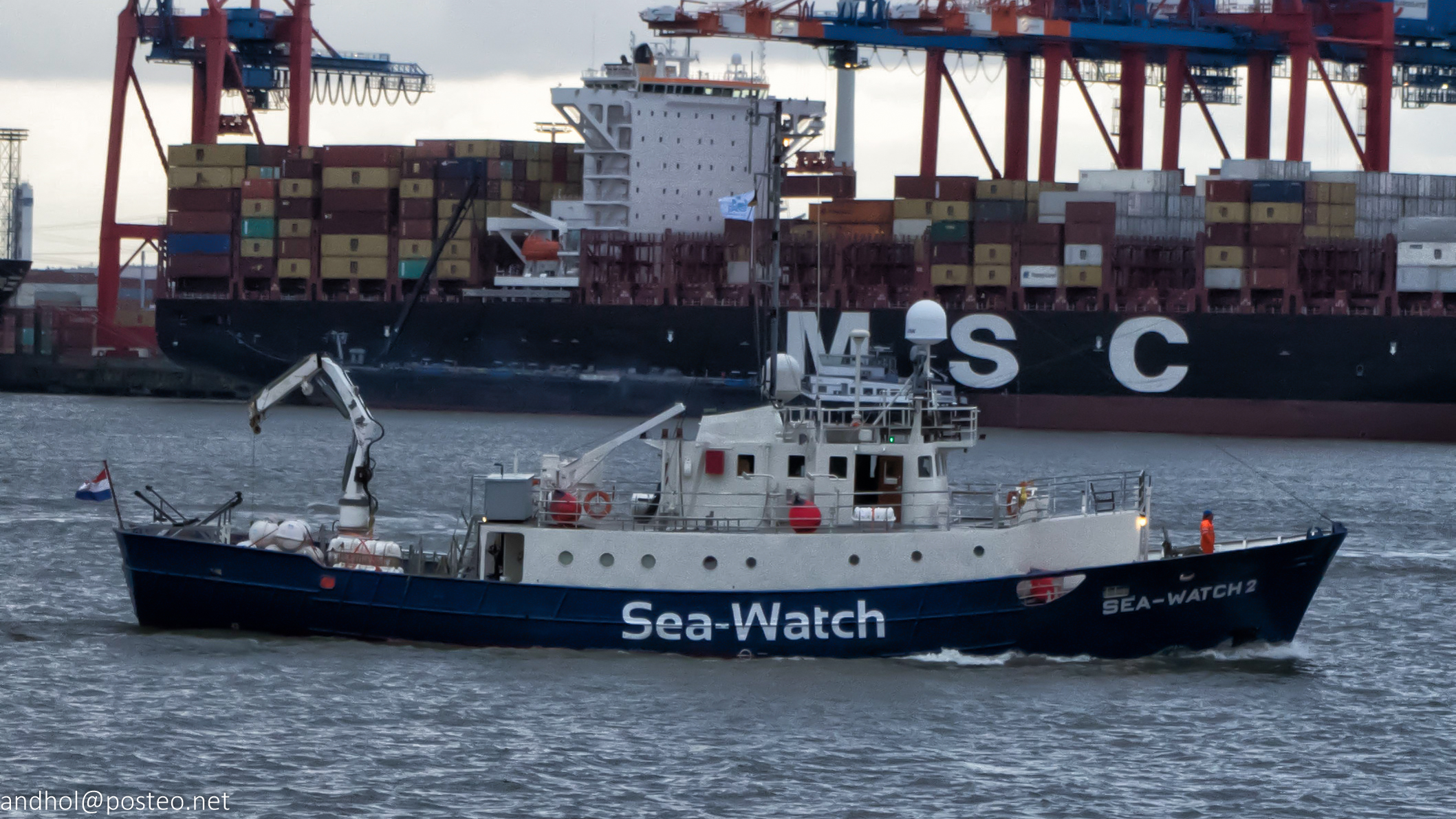
- Established: 19 May 2015 (11 years ago)
- Founders: Harald Höppner
- Legal status: Registered association
- Headquarters: Berlin
- Membership: 68 (2026)
- Revenue: 11,813,484.55 (2023)
- Total Assets: 13,230,843.03 (2023)
- Employees: 128 (2024)

Sea-Watch is a German non-governmental organisation that operates in the Mediterranean Sea, notably by commissioning reconnaissance aircraft to find boats and ships potentially in distress to rescue their occupants and bring them to a place of safety.

== Cooperation with Protestant Church ==
The sea rescue ship Sea-Watch 4 (with the suffix "powered by United4Rescue"), financed by the Protestant Church in Germany (EKD), was deployed under the direction of Sea-Watch in 2020. For this purpose, the sponsoring association, United4Rescue, was set up, with Thies Gundlach from the EKD as the first chairman and Michael Schwickart from Sea-Watch as the second chairman.

== Ships ==
Sea-Watch was a former 21.12-meter (69 ft 3 in) fishing ship. Built in 1917 and purchased in 2015, Sea-Watch used her in 2015 until she was transferred later that year to the organisation Mare Liberum, receiving the name Mare Liberum.

Sea-Watch 2 was a former fishing research ship, originally entering service as Clupea in 1968. She was deployed on 14-day rescue operations between Libya and Malta in 2016 and 2017 along with Sea-Watch. Sold to the organisation Mission Lifeline, she now operates under the name Lifeline.

Sea-Watch 3 was a 50.53-meter (165 ft 9 in) ship. Built in 1972 as an offshore supply ship, the organisation Médecins Sans Frontières commissioned it as a search and rescue vessel under the name Dignity I before transfer to Sea-Watch.

Sea-Watch 4 was a 60.70-meter (199 ft 2 in) ship. Built in 1976 as a research ship, the Evangelical Church in Germany formed an association to buy the ship in early 2020. The ship is run by a cooperation between Sea-Watch and Médecins Sans Frontières and operated as a German-flagged rescue vessel in the Mediterranean Sea since August 2020. In 2022 it was handed over to SOS Humanity and renamed Humanity 1.

The Sea-Watch 5 is a 58-meter (190 ft 3 in) ship. It started its work with Sea-Watch in December 2023. The ship rescued 49 migrants off Malta on 22 November 2024. In October 2025 an event hosted by the initiative INK AGAINST BORDERS organized by queer-feminist tattoo artists and supporters fundraised successfully for Sea-Watch 5 to provide financial support for 16 days of its operation.

The Aurora is a 14-meter (45 ft 11 in) boat. She was originally put into service with Royal National Lifeboat Institution (RNLI) as a Trent-class lifeboat and was retired in 2019. Sea-Watch activists bought her and use her for picking up migrants in distress in the Mediterranean starting 2022, now under German flag.

The Aurora SAR 2is another Trent-class lifeboat 14-meter (45 ft 11 in), acquired by Sea-Watch in 2025 and put in service in the Mediterranean in June 2026.

Ships of Sea-Watch
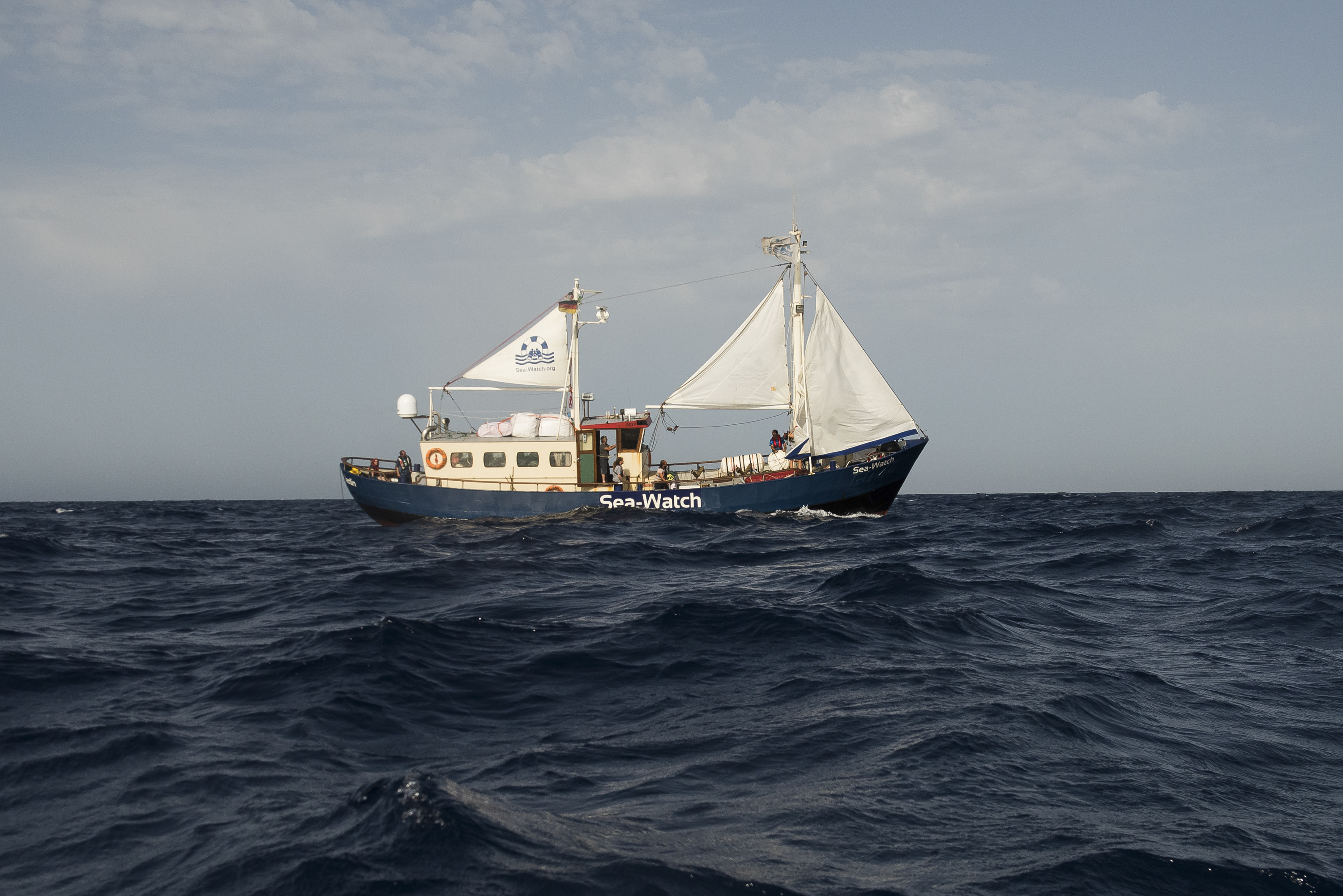
MS Sea-Watch, a 100-year old former fishing cutter, on her first mission

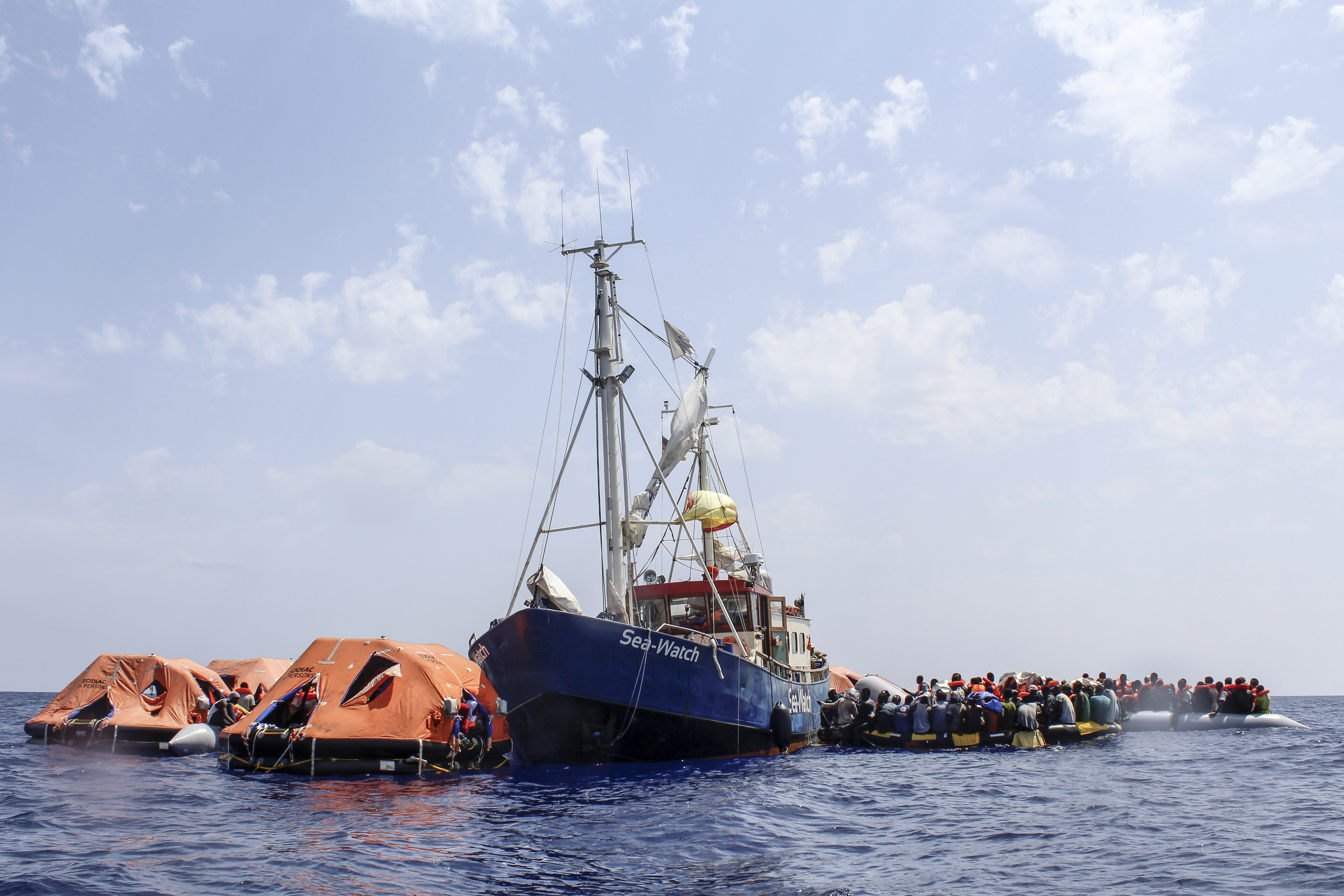
MS Sea-Watch surrounded by refugee boats and life rafts while it waits for assistance on 5 July 2015

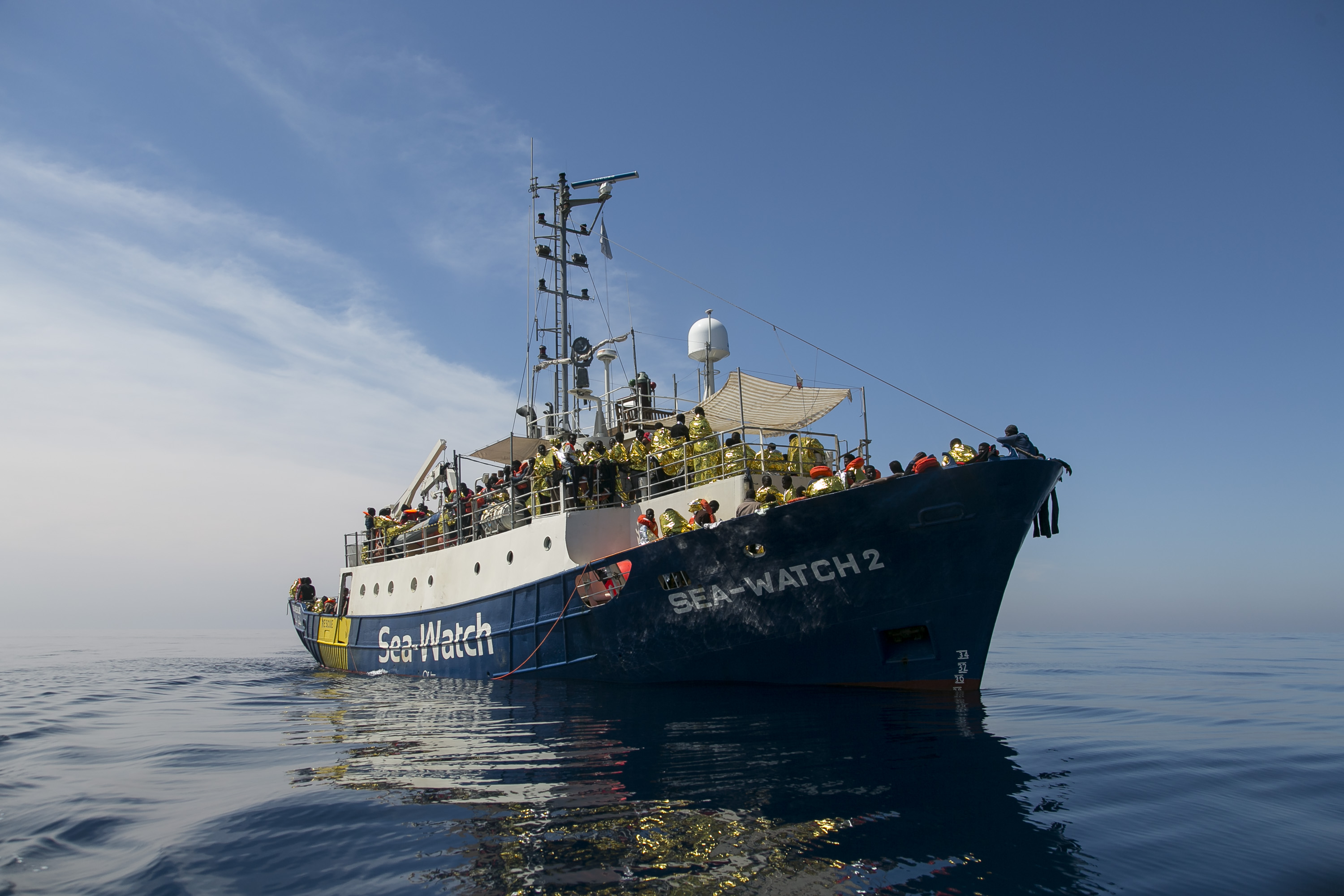
Sea-Watch 2 crowded with survivors who cover themselves in rescue blankets on 19 March 2017

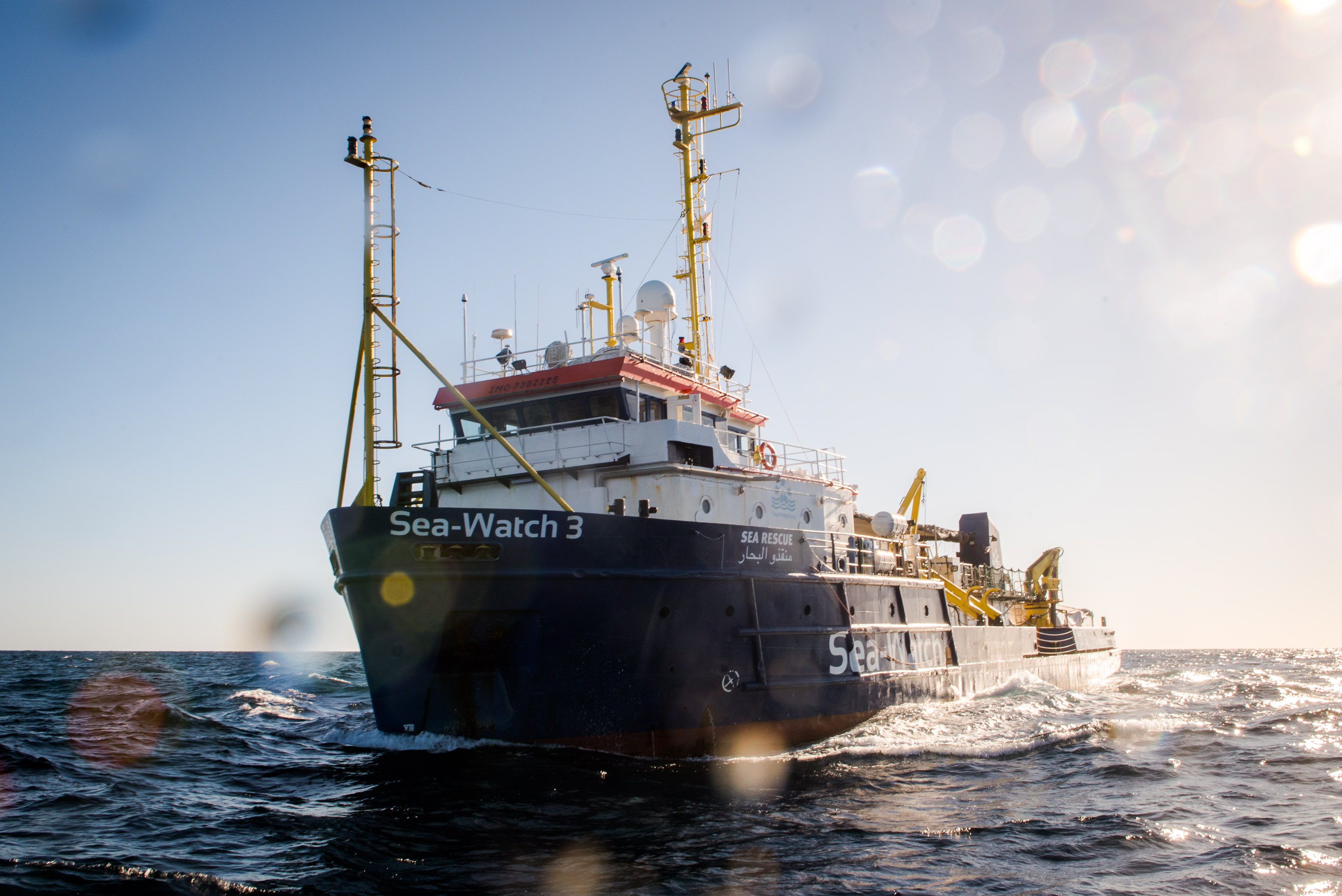
Sea-Watch 3 patrolling the central Mediterranean search and rescue area on 19 December 2018, two days before the rescue of 32 people. The incident led to an 18-day standoff in front of Malta.

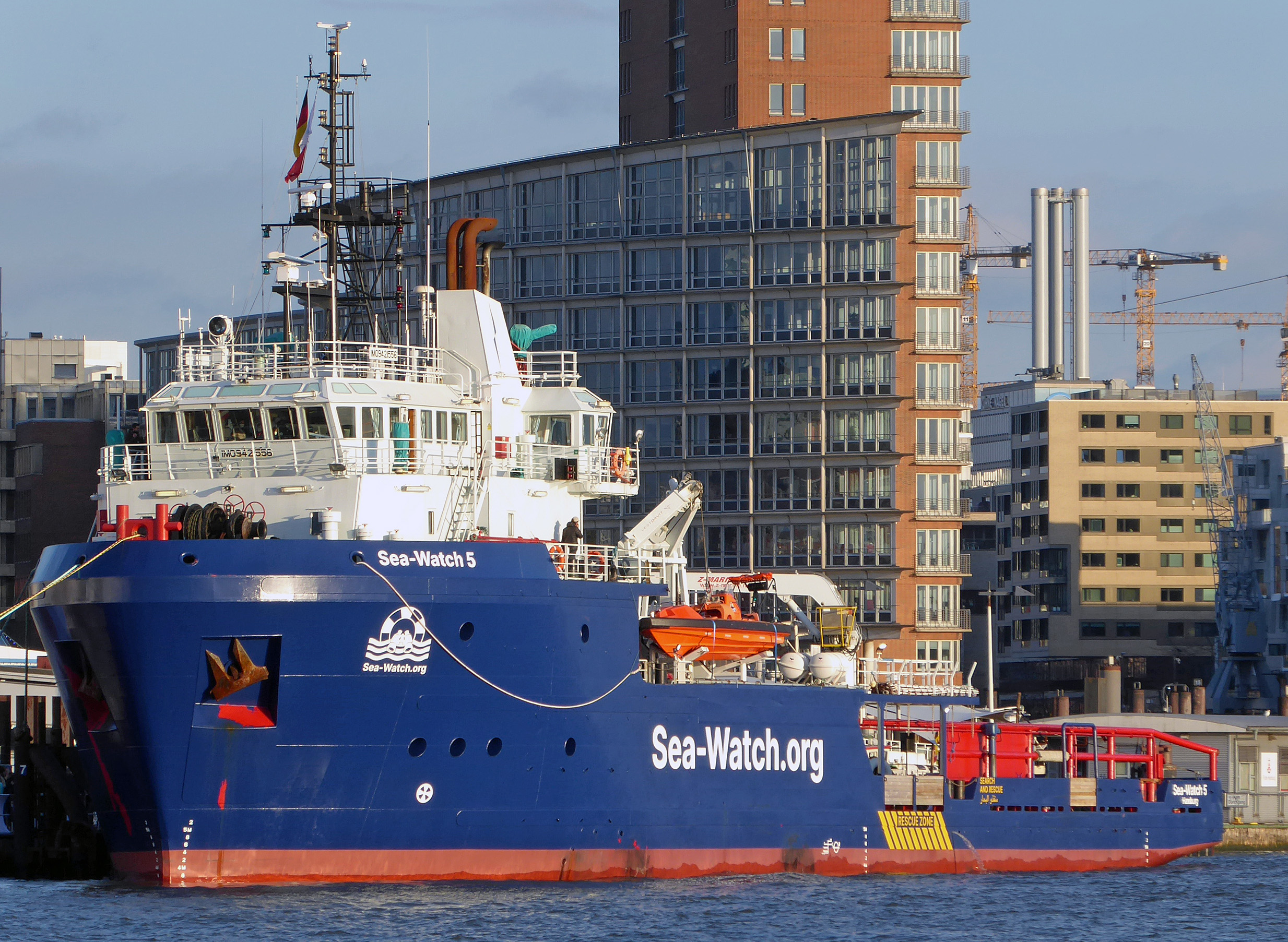
Sea-Watch 5

== Reconnaissance aircraft ==
Since 2017, Sea-Watch have operated a SAR-coordinating reconnaissance aircraft, Moonbird, a single-engined Cirrus SR22, and since June 2020, also the Seabird, a twin-engined high-performance Beechcraft Baron 58. "Moonbird" was phased out in 2022 and replaced by another Beechcraft Baron 58 named "Seabird 2". These are flown in cooperation with the Swiss NGO Humanitarian Pilots Initiative. By August 2025, together with Association Pilotes Volontaires (APV) flying "Colibri 2", NGOs operated three aircraft from Italy; these observing aircraft were used to scout for migrant boats. The APV aircraft was grounded by the Italian Civil Aviation Authority (Enac) for 20 days in August 2025.

== Operational history ==
=== 2017 ===
On 6 November 2017, the crew of a Sea-Watch ship rescued 58 people in an operation hindered by the Libyan Navy. Twenty other people drowned. Video footage that implicated the Libyan Coast Guard was later used in legal action against Italy in the European Court of Human Rights.

=== 2018 ===
The ship Sea-Watch resumed her operations in November 2018 after it was detained in Malta between July and October.

On 22 December 2018, another of the organisation's ships, Sea-Watch 3, rescued around 32 people, but was unable to dock in Malta, Italy, or Spain.

=== 2019 ===
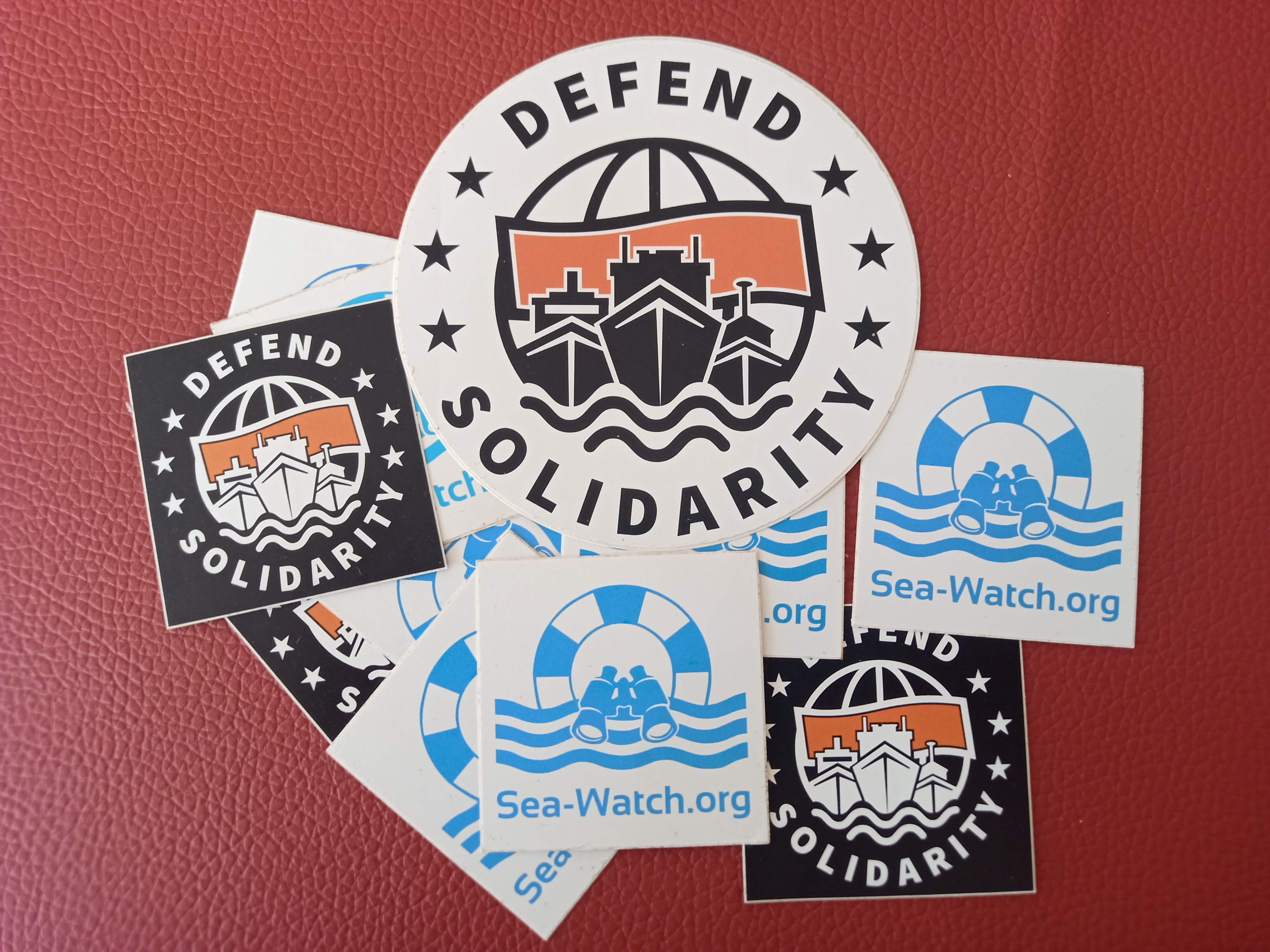
Stickers of Sea-Watch and its Defend solidarity campaign

On 3 January 2019, France, Germany and the Netherlands offered to take some of the 49 migrants blocked off Malta on Sea-Watch and Sea-Eye "as a collective allocation effort". According to Mina Andreeva, the spokeswoman of the European Commission, more solidarity is needed along with "foreseeable and sustainable solutions for the landing and re-localization in the Mediterranean"; she quoted the commissioner in charge of migration, Dimitris Avramopoulos.

Two weeks after the rescue, the 49 migrants were still blocked off Malta on Sea-Watch 3 and the Sea-Eye, in spite of an appeal by Pope Francis. On 9 January, they were finally allowed to disembark in Malta after an agreement to relocate them to eight other European countries was reached. On 19 January, Sea-Watch 3 rescued 47 further migrants. The Italian government forbade her from entering the port, and initiated legal action against the Netherlands; the organisation referred the case to the European Court of Human Rights. On 29 January, Italy, Germany, France, Malta, Portugal, Romania, and Luxembourg agreed to relocate the 47 migrants. Deputy Prime Minister of Italy Matteo Salvini demanded that Sea-Watch 3 be detained. As the ship was docked at the Italian city Catania to land the migrants, she was blocked by the Italian military on the grounds of "several non-conformities"; the organisation called the obstruction political pressure.

On 19 May 2019, the Italian police seized Sea-Watch 3 at the island Lampedusa, allowing the disembarking of the 47 migrants whom she had recently picked up on 15 May 2019. Reports of the operations angered Matteo Salvini, who opposed the landing of the migrants. In June 2019, the ship was again detained; 53 migrants had been rescued from the coast of Libya on 12 June. Italy allowed only 11 especially vulnerable people to disembark; on 25 June 2019, the captain of Sea-Watch 3 threatened to land at Lampedusa in spite of the interdiction, eventually entering Italian territorial waters. According to the organisation, it was "not as a provocative act, but out of necessity and responsibility". A column in French newspaper Le Monde stated that Captain Carola Rackete was only "reminding us all of the existence of international conventions such as that stating rescue at sea is a duty for all". In an editorial in the same newspaper, 700 celebrities supported the migrants and opposed Salvini. A poll by Italian daily Il Giornale showed that 61% of Italians were opposed to Sea-Watch 3 landing at Lampedusa. During the night of 28 to 29 June, the ship was seized, and Carola Rackete was arrested for helping illegal immigration. Sea-Watch 3 later collided with the 50-knot Class 800 patrol boat "808" of Italian law enforcement agency Guardia di Finanza, which had tried to block the larger vessel from docking. The boat was pushed against the dock and slightly damaged. Since the Guardia di Finanza was legally considered a combatant while it protected waterways, the Italian media reported that Rackete could also be charged with attack on a warship, a crime punishable with 3 to 10 years in prison. Two days later, an Italian judge decided that no further incarceration was necessary, and Rackete was released. As of July 2019, the criminal investigation continues.

From September to December, Sea-Watch 3 was detained at Licata.

=== 2020 ===
Sea-Watch 4 was introduced.

=== 2021 ===
Despite complications during the COVID-19 pandemic, and further detentions, rescues continued.

=== 2022 ===
In between further periods of detention, rescues continued; in August, Sea-Watch 4 was acquired by SOS Humanity.

=== 2023 ===
Sea-Watch 3 was scrapped; Sea-Watch 5 began rescue services.

=== 2024 ===
Rescues continued, using Sea-Watch 5.

=== 2025 ===
In late August 2025 activists with the Alarmphone NGO got an emergency call from a boat which had left Libya with 41 migrants on 27 August and got in distress. Alarmphone organised a rescue and platform support vessel Maridive 208 was instructed by Tunisian authorities to pick the migrants up. Activists didn't want them to be brought to Tunisia, which they do not consider a "safe harbor". The migrants themselves refused to be rescued by a Tunisian navy vessel that had been dispatched and stayed on the Maridive 208. Sea-Watch aircraft began to monitor the ship. Running low on supplies, the Maridive 208 entered Maltas territorial waters, but neither Italy nor Malta wanted to take the people in. Sea-Watch vessel Aurora finally evacuated the migrants from the Maridive 208 on 2 September, but the activists calls for a harbor got again ignored by authorities in Malta and Italy. The activists finally made their way to Lampedusa on 4 September 2025 and landed the 41 migrants, most of them claiming to be from Sudan.

=== 2026 ===
After several operations early in the year, by late March and early April 2026 both active Sea-Watch vessels in the Mediterranean, Sea Watch 5 and Aurora, had been impounded by Italian authorities for disobeying orders, which usually meant the failure to coordinate with the Libyan authorities or not accepting ports assigned to them for disembarkation by Italian authorities. In July 2026 il Giornale published video evidence from 12 May 2026, showing alleged trafficers steering a speedboat directly at an idle Sea Watch 5. The men then oversaw the transfer of the migrants from their speedboat onto a Sea-Watch RHIB. Sea-Watch itself had claimed that they had been looking for the migrants lost at sea that day. Sea Watch 5 Captain Anne van Dam was put under investigation for aiding and abetting illegal immigration.

In June 2026 the activists got a second small craft, the Aurora SAR 2, to operate in the Mediterranean as part of their "small boat" strategy, making it easier to point to low supplies on board when in contact with Italian authorities, in order to force their way to a closer port. The boat picked up 40 migrants on 4 June and delivered them to Lampedusa.

On 11 October and 12 October 2026 Sea-Watch 5 and Aurora 2 picked up a combined number of 227 migrants. While the small Aurora 2 was allowed by Italian authorities to head to Lampedusa, the larger Sea-Watch 5 was assigned Civitavecchia.

== See also ==
- 2013 Lampedusa migrant shipwreck
- Operation Mare Nostrum
- Pia Klemp
- Hellenic Rescue Team
- Iuventa
- Mediterranea Saving Humans
- Migrant Offshore Aid Station
- No Border network
- Proactiva Open Arms
- SOS Méditerranée
