= Port of Trapani =

Commercial and passenger seaport in Trapani, Sicily

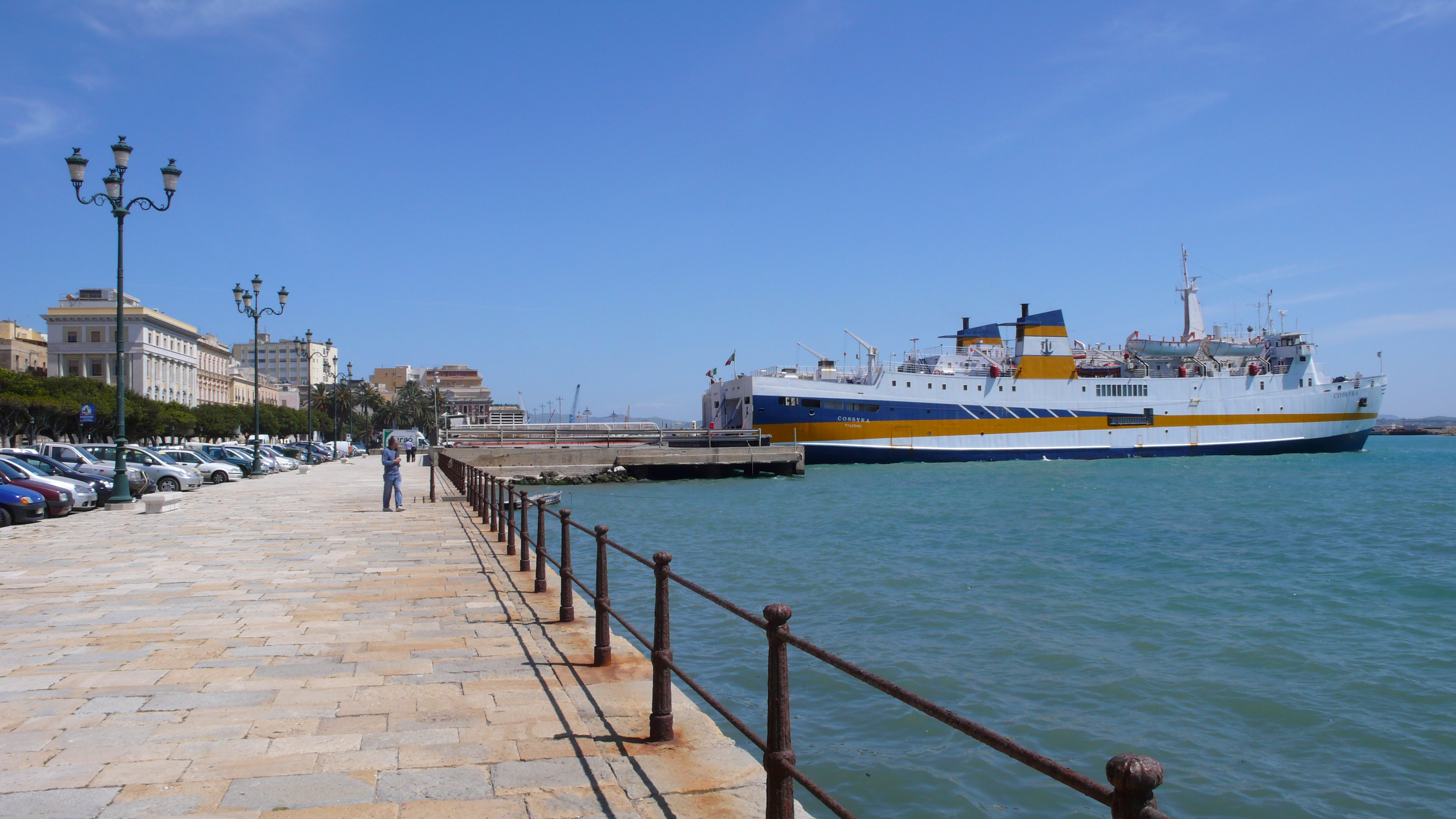
- The Port of Trapani
- Interactive map of Port of Trapani
- Native name: Porto di Trapani

Location
- Country: Italy
- Location: Trapani, Sicily
- Coordinates: 38°00′51.05″N 12°30′26.21″E

Details
- Opened: 19th century (modern harbour)
- Operated by: Autorità di Sistema Portuale del Mare di Sicilia Occidentale
- Type of Harbor: Commercial, passenger, fishing, leisure
- No. of berths: Multiple commercial, passenger and fishing berths
- No. of wharfs: Ronciglio; Ronciglio Levante; Molo Sanità; Garibaldi; Dogana; Marinella; Ex Sommergibili; Isolella

Statistics
- Website; Official website

The Port of Trapani (Italian: Porto di Trapani) is the commercial and passenger seaport serving the city of Trapani in western Sicily, Italy. It functions as a multipurpose harbour handling general cargo, roll-on/roll-off traffic, ferries, hydrofoils, cruise ships, fishing vessels and leisure craft.

The port has played a central role in the area’s history from antiquity—when the harbour of ancient Drepanon developed along the north-facing shoreline—through its later transformation into a modern engineered port on the southern and eastern sides of the peninsula.

It is administered by the Autorità di Sistema Portuale del Mare di Sicilia Occidentale. Ongoing redevelopment projects include major dredging, quay consolidation and waterfront-improvement works, funded in part through Italy’s National Recovery and Resilience Plan.

== History ==
The history of the Port of Trapani reflects the development of the city itself, from its origins as the harbour of ancient Drepanon to its later roles as a medieval trading port, a centre of early modern maritime activity and, eventually, a modern commercial harbour shaped by 19th- and 20th-century engineering works.

=== Ancient and classical period ===
In antiquity the settlement at the tip of the Trapani peninsula was known as Drepanon (Latin: Drepanum), a name derived from the Greek word for “sickle” in reference to the curved shape of the promontory. Classical sources and modern reference works describe Drepanon as the harbour and later trading centre of the Elymian city of Eryx (modern Erice), serving as the coastal outlet for the Erycinians from at least the 5th–4th century BC.

During the First Punic War the Carthaginian general Hamilcar Barca fortified the promontory around 260 BC and transferred part of the population of Eryx to the new town, which thereafter became an important Carthaginian naval base; after the Roman victory in 241 BC it passed into Roman control as a secondary commercial centre alongside nearby Lilybaeum (modern Marsala).

=== Medieval and early modern harbour ===
Trapani’s working harbour during the medieval and early modern periods developed along the northern shoreline of the peninsula, beneath the later Mura di Tramontana, where deeper water lay close to the coast and a naturally indented shoreline offered shelter. This stretch supported the development of piers, quays, salt warehouses and fishermen’s houses that served the city’s maritime and commercial activity. By contrast, the southern and southeastern sides of the peninsula consisted largely of shallow tidal flats and marshy ground, providing no reliable deep-water anchorage and therefore remaining unsuitable for significant harbour installations until large-scale engineering works began in the modern era.

=== 19th-century expansion and modernisation ===
The modern harbour of Trapani began to take shape in the late 19th century, when large-scale engineering was first undertaken on the southern side of the peninsula. In 1896 the Colombaia breakwater was constructed using 50-ton concrete blockwork—the earliest documented application of this technique in Italy—marking the beginning of Trapani’s transformation from a shallow, marsh-bordered coastline into an engineered commercial port.

=== 20th-century development ===
By the early 20th century contemporary local reports described Trapani as “among the principal ports of the Kingdom in terms of the number and tonnage of ships handled”.

At the same time, long-standing problems of silting—caused in part by the torrents Lenzi and Baiata and by the expansion of the southern salt-pans—continued to limit access to the inner harbour and reduce navigable depth along significant sections of the waterfront.

A major programme of dredging was carried out in the 1920s to deepen parts of the harbour basin; during these works Bronze Age metal ingots were recovered from the seabed, providing incidental archaeological evidence for the antiquity of the anchorage.

During the Second World War Trapani suffered heavy Allied bombing in the 1943 campaign in western Sicily, and the port area was among the targets of repeated air raids. Contemporary accounts describe extensive destruction in the city and along the waterfront, leaving significant sections of the port in need of post-war repair.

In the decades after 1945 further interventions—including a port masterplan adopted in 1962 and successive dredging and quay-modernisation programmes—progressively reshaped the southern and eastern waterfront into the modern commercial harbour managed today by the Port Authority.

=== 21st-century redevelopment ===
In the early 21st century the port became the focus of modernisation and redevelopment initiatives intended to improve navigational safety, upgrade commercial and passenger facilities, and strengthen integration with the urban waterfront. Studies commissioned by the Port Authority identified the need to renew ageing infrastructure, adapt the harbour to contemporary ferry and cruise-ship requirements, and rationalise circulation along the waterfront and port-access roads.

Subsequent works have included dredging and deepening of commercial basins, reinforcement and modernisation of quays, and improvements to passenger-handling areas used by ferries and cruise vessels. Projects have also reorganised port circulation and upgraded breakwaters and protective structures to enhance operability in adverse conditions.

Future development plans include a large-scale dredging programme valued at about €67.5 million to deepen parts of the harbour basin, together with works to complete and upgrade the northern quays, consolidate and seismically strengthen the Ronciglio and Riva quays, and construct a new road bridge linking the Ronciglio quays.

Additional measures, some financed through Italy’s National Recovery and Resilience Plan (PNRR), provide for the removal of the Ronciglio breakwater and associated dredging, the implementation of a Smart Port programme for energy-efficiency and digital monitoring systems, and the rehabilitation of the historic waterfront and adjoining public spaces.

In parallel, the Port Authority is evaluating longer-term innovation measures, including potential offshore-wind logistics functions and hydrogen-ready or low-carbon energy infrastructure as part of wider decarbonisation strategies.

== Facilities ==
The Port of Trapani and its facilities

The Port of Trapani lies in a naturally sheltered inlet between the Trapani peninsula and a series of breakwaters built along its southern and eastern sides. The harbour is roughly 2 kilometres long and between about 225 and 450 metres wide. The port is organised around a series of principal quays and terminals used for commercial, passenger, fishing and leisure-boating activity.

=== Commercial quays ===
The principal commercial facilities are concentrated along the Ronciglio quay and its extension, Ronciglio Levante, where water depths of around 12 metres allow access for larger general-cargo and roll-on/roll-off (Ro-Ro) vessels. The sector includes a cargo terminal of approximately 25,000 m² equipped with two 100-ton mobile cranes, four reach-stackers and associated handling equipment.

Inner quays such as Marinella, Dogana, Garibaldi and Ex Sommergibili have depths of about 8 metres and accommodate smaller cargo ships and local maritime traffic.

A programme to upgrade the commercial sector is ongoing, including a €60.5 million project funded through the National Recovery and Resilience Plan to deepen approach channels and modernise quay structures at the Ronciglio east pier.

=== Fast-ferry terminal ===
A dedicated fast-ferry terminal was inaugurated on the Molo Sanità in July 2019. Located on the Marinella quay, the facility includes a ticket office, bar and air-conditioned waiting area, and serves fast-ferry and hydrofoil services operating between Trapani and the Aegadian Islands (Favignana, Levanzo and Marettimo), Pantelleria, mainland Sicily and mainland Italy.

=== Cruise and passenger terminal ===
In December 2021 the port inaugurated a new cruise and passenger terminal. The single-storey facility, covering about 1,000 m², includes eight ticket offices, a large waiting hall, seating areas, a bar and a newsstand, and is connected to pedestrian routes and landscaped external areas. The project, valued at about €7 million, forms part of wider works to modernise the Molo Sanità and adapt it for cruise-ship use; a further phase of structural consolidation and seismic upgrading on its eastern quay is intended to enable full operation of the pier as the port’s principal passenger and cruise berth, bringing total investment to around €8 million. Larger ferry-cruise vessels may also use deeper-water sections of the port, such as the Ronciglio quay, depending on operational requirements.

In 2025 the port recorded 18,282 cruise passengers and 61 cruise ship calls, according to figures released by the Western Sicily Port Authority. From 2026 the port is expected to expand its cruise programme, including scheduled calls by small and mid-sized luxury cruise vessels. The authority has also announced plans to introduce shore power (cold ironing) facilities at Trapani to allow berthed vessels to connect to the electrical grid and reduce emissions. Separate measures aimed at improving passenger capacity and flow management have also been outlined.

=== Fishing harbour ===
Trapani maintains an active fishing harbour, with the fleet generally mooring along quays on the western side of the port, close to the historic centre. The area forms part of a wider waterfront zone that includes the wholesale fish market (mercato ittico) in Via Cristoforo Colombo, one of the most active in western Sicily and a key outlet for catches landed by the local fleet and by vessels from other Sicilian ports.

Alongside the wholesale structure, a renovated indoor retail fish market was inaugurated in November 2021 in the same Via Cristoforo Colombo building, following redevelopment works carried out under the FLAG Trapanese’s Local Action Plan. The project returned a refurbished indoor facility compliant with hygiene and food-safety standards.

A waterfront redevelopment project announced in 2022 proposed reorganised quayside areas for fishing activities, improved spaces for fish handling and retail, and upgraded public areas around the western harbour.

=== Marina and leisure boating ===
A marina and leisure-craft area is located near the fishing harbour on the western side of the port, close to the historic centre. In addition to public berths, several privately operated facilities provide moorings for pleasure craft. According to published information, the leisure-boating area offers about 150 berths on quays and floating pontoons, generally accommodating vessels up to 25–30 metres in length, with depths of about 5 metres.

Facilities typically include water and electricity supply, fuel services, waste-disposal points, toilets and showers, Wi-Fi coverage and 24-hour security. Some areas also provide repair and storage services with hardstanding, a travel lift and a crane, as well as VHF radio assistance.

A small tourist landing area along Viale Regina Elena accommodates leisure traffic and day-trip vessels, supporting excursion services and charter sailings to the Aegadian Islands. Additional operators provide organised boat excursions and private charters.

=== Port infrastructure and services ===
The port’s technical–nautical services are regulated by national maritime law and local port regulations. Pilotage is compulsory for ships over 500 GT, with exemptions for warships, local traffic and certain fishing vessels. A locally licensed pilot boards arriving ships outside the harbour entrance and may, in the case of line ferries up to 500 GT, provide pilotage by VHF radio.

Mooring assistance is available 24 hours a day on VHF channel 12 and is compulsory for merchant ships of 500 GT and above, for smaller vessels carrying dangerous goods, and for all passenger ships and fast ferries. Hydrographic information notes that no harbour tugs are permanently based at Trapani, and that towage is organised in accordance with regional regulations for western Sicilian ports.

Reception and treatment of ship-generated waste and cargo residues are provided under an approved port waste-management plan for Trapani, drawn up in line with Italian legislation implementing the MARPOL convention. The plan foresees collection by authorised operators using mobile and floating equipment rather than fixed installations, and applies to commercial shipping, fishing vessels and pleasure craft.

Port security is coordinated by the Capitaneria di Porto and the Port Authority. Passenger and yachting berths operate under port-facility security plans implementing the International Ship and Port Facility Security (ISPS) Code, and joint security and fire-response exercises are periodically carried out.

== Sport and events ==
Trapani hosted two stages of the 32nd America’s Cup preparatory series in 2005, known as the Trapani Louis Vuitton Acts 8 and 9. The back-to-back regattas, held from late September to early October, featured both match racing and fleet racing and concluded the 2005 America’s Cup season. According to event organisers, Trapani was selected for its reliable wind conditions, the proximity of berthing areas to the racecourse, and the natural backdrop of the Aegadian Islands, which contributed to strong public interest.

The port has been a rallypoint for various NGO ships involved with migrant rescue in the 2020s. Several of these rescue vessels were impounded in Trapani for allegedly violating regulations, including Iuventa (2017), Ocean Viking (8/2025), Humanity 1 (2/2026) and Sea-Watch 5 (3/2026).

== Gallery ==
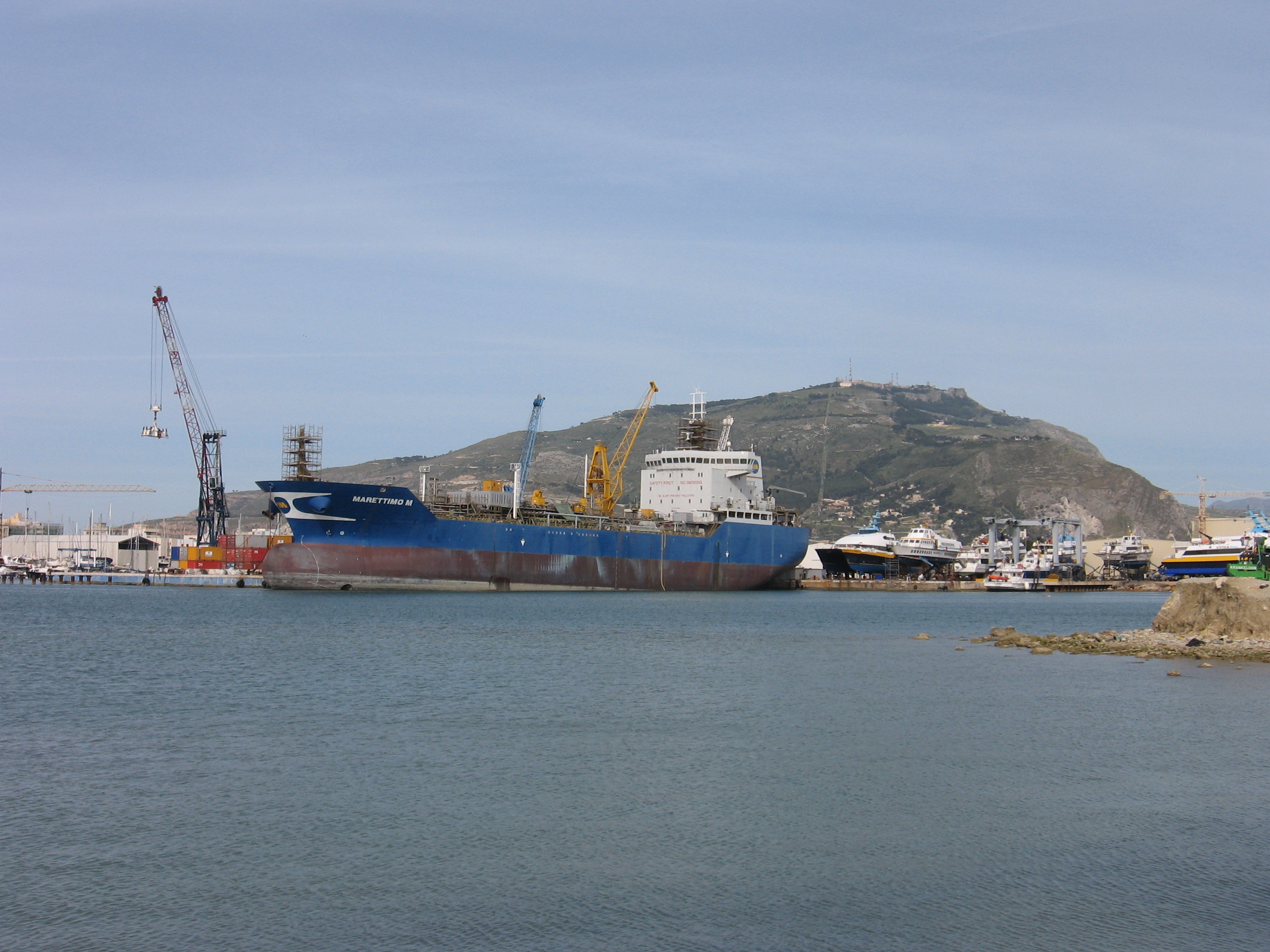
Commercial quays

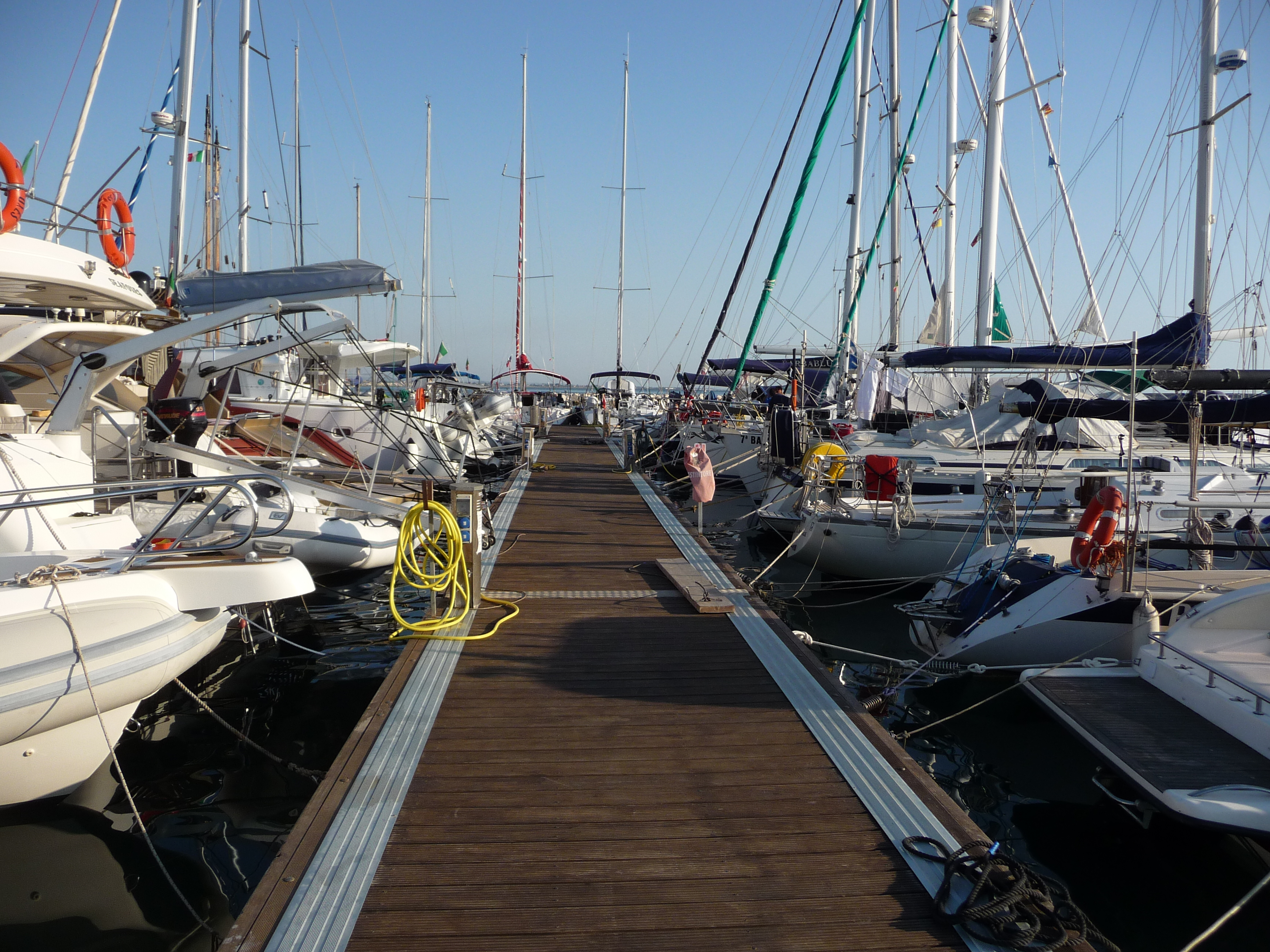
Leisure-boating area

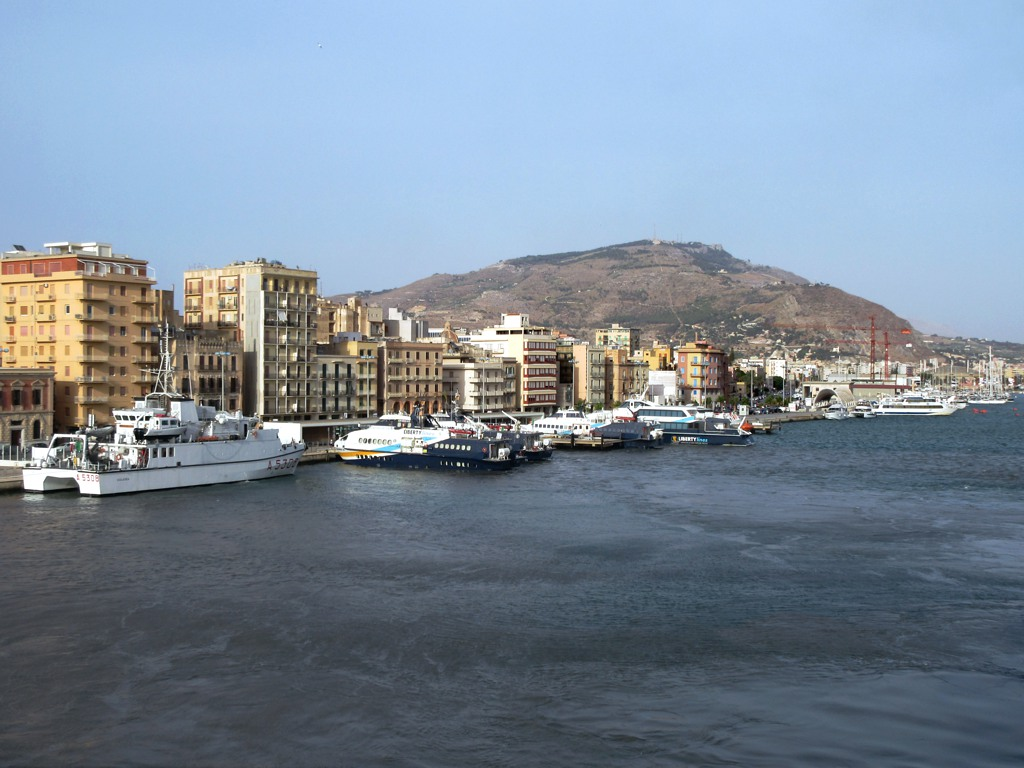
Fast-ferry and hydrofoil berths

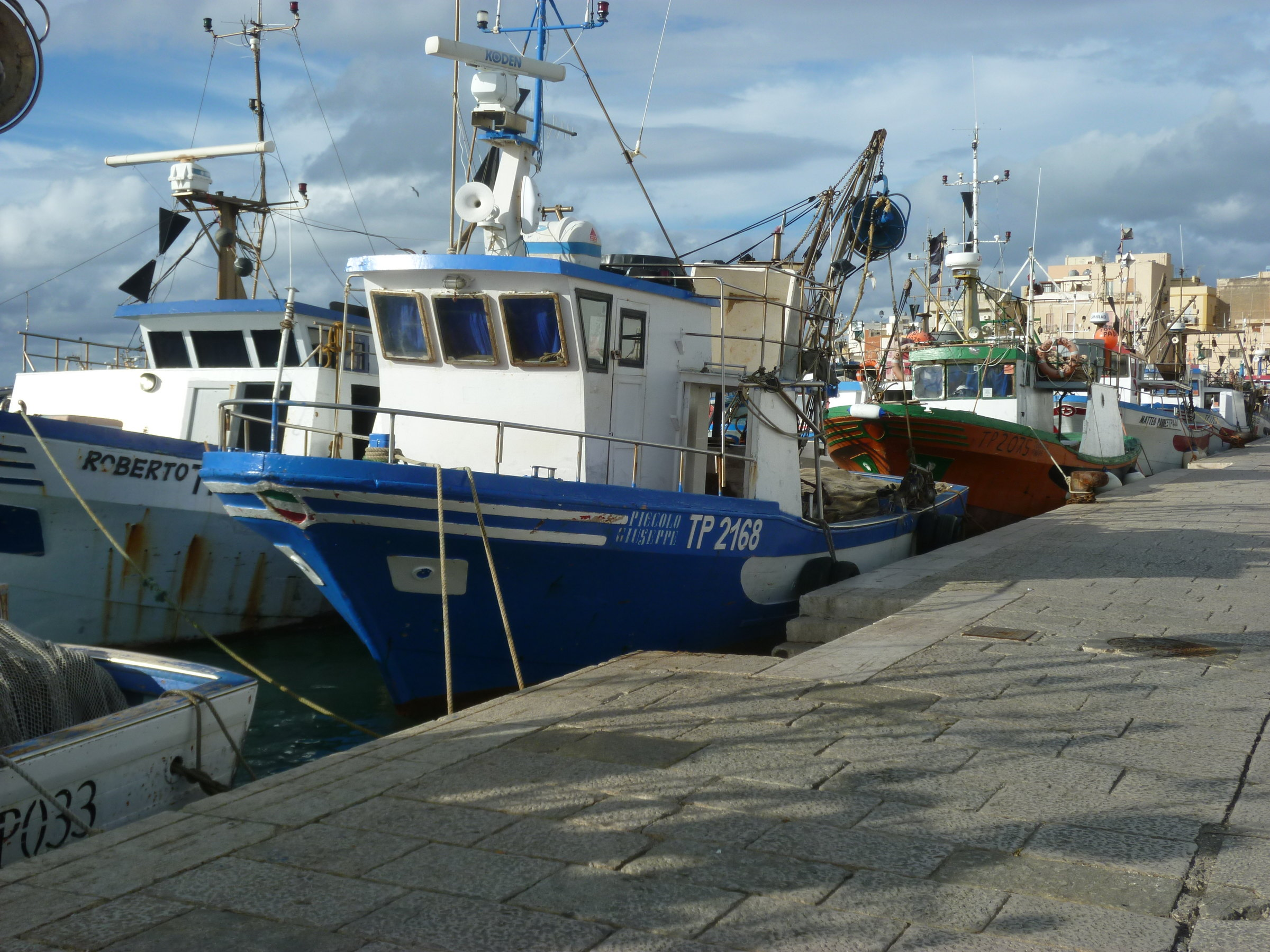
Fishing boats
