= Clupea (disambiguation) =

Clupea is a genus of true herrings.

Clupea may also refer to:

- FRV Clupea, Scottish inshore fisheries research vessel
- Kelibia, coastal town in northeastern Tunisia known in Roman times as Clupea
