= Mission Eleonore =

The ship Eleonore, or Mission Eleonore, is a former fishing vessel which was operated on the Mediterranean Sea by the German NGO Mission Lifeline for the rescue of shipwrecked refugees. Following the confiscation in summer 2018 of their previous rescue ship Lifeline, Eleonore sailed for a single mission which ended with the confiscation of Eleonore in turn. In the one mission undertaken, Eleonore rescued 104 people from drowning.

== Technical details ==
The Eleonore is a former fishing boat, currently registered as a pleasure boat. Eleonore is 20 m in length; her MMSI is 211265310.

== Purchase of Eleonore ==
Benjamin Hartmann, owner of the statement fashion label HUMAN BLOOD, officially acted as the buyer for the purchase of the fishing boat Eleonore in May 2019. The subsequent conversion to a rescue ship was financed by the donor and Mission Lifeline. According to the association's founder, Axel Steier, it was necessary to use a 'straw man' because the authorities were unlikely to let him or his captain register a rescue ship.

== Operation ==
Eleonore, registered as a pleasure boat, set out at the end of August 2019 for the sea area off the Libyan coast, under the command of Claus-Peter Reisch. The crew was informed of the position of a struggling rubber dinghy by the Alarm-Phone-Initiative and finally took on a total of 104 people from the dinghy. Both Italy and Malta refused requests to enter their ports, so the overcrowded rescue ship had to be supplied with food and water on the high seas. At the beginning of September, after violent thunderstorms, Reisch declared the Eleonore an emergency due to a life-threatening situation on board, and ran into the Sicilian port of Pozzallo accompanied by the Italian coast guard. This, however, was contrary to the instructions of Interior Minister Matteo Salvini, and the Eleonore was then confiscated by the Italian police.

== See also ==
- List of ships for the rescue of refugees in the Mediterranean Sea
