= Fisheries Research Services =

Executive agency of the Scottish government

Executive Agency overview
- Dissolved: 1 April 2009
- Superseding Executive Agency: Marine Scotland
- Jurisdiction: Scotland
- Headquarters: Aberdeen

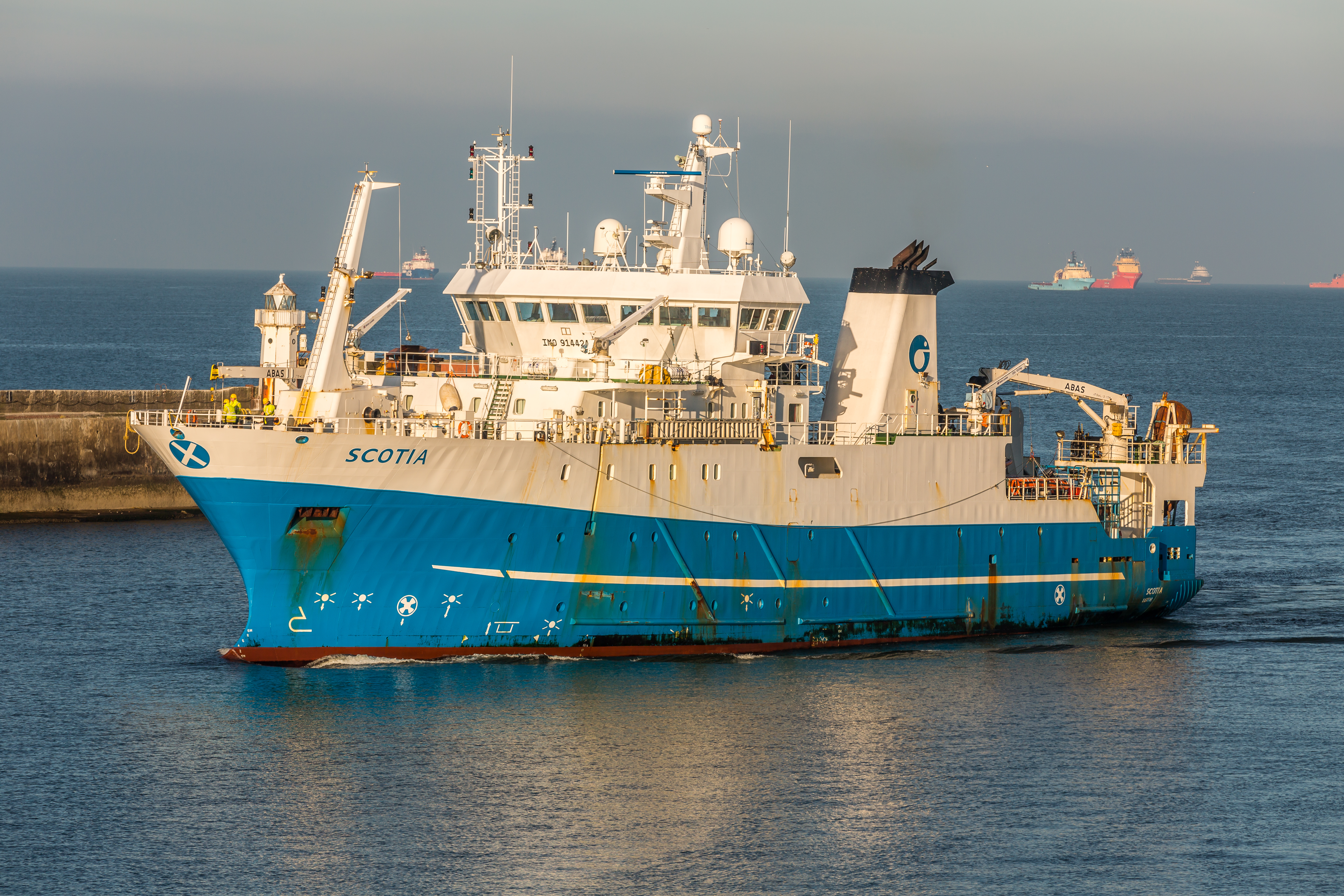
FRV Scotia in Aberdeen Harbour

Fisheries Research Services (FRS) was an Executive Agency of the Scottish Government. FRS was responsible for scientific and technical research into the marine and freshwater fisheries and aquaculture, and the protection of the aquatic environment in Scotland. For these purposes, the agency had two fishery laboratories, allowing specialisation in both marine and freshwater fisheries. The FRS also maintained two research vessels.

On 1 April 2009, Fisheries Research Services was merged with the Scottish Fisheries Protection Agency and the Scottish Government Marine Directorate to form Marine Scotland, part of the core Scottish Government.

== Structure ==
The marine laboratory is based in Victoria Road, Aberdeen; and the freshwater laboratory is based in Pitlochry, Perth and Kinross. The Agency also maintained other temporary research sites throughout Scotland. The Agency also had two research vessels, FRV Scotia and FRV Alba-Na-Mara.

The Agency was directly funded by the Scottish Government, which made up around 60% of income. The other 40% was derived from research income for projects carried out in conjunction with other government bodies in Europe. The Agency also worked with private firms.

== Notable Staff ==
- Bennet Birnie Rae
- Sir Fred Holliday

== See also ==
- Fishing in Scotland
