= Humanity 2 =

History
- Name: Humanity 2
- Builder: Kempers
- Completed: 1985
- Refit: 2026
- Home port: Kiel

General characteristics
- Displacement: 90 long tons (91 t) full load
- Length: 23.89 m (78.4 ft)
- Beam: 5.98 m (19.6 ft)
- Draught: 2.7 m (8 ft 10 in)
- Propulsion: 230 kW (308 hp) MAN D2542 engine
- Sail plan: Ketch, 330 m^{2} (3,600 sq ft) sail area
- Speed: 11 kn (max, engine)

Humanity 2 is a sailing vessel operated by the German NGO SOS Humanity for the monitoring of sea areas and rescue of people in difficulty on the Mediterranean Sea. At the start of 2026, the boat was being converted from its former use for leisure sailing to its new purpose for rescue at sea, whilst at a shipyard in Syracuse, Italy.

Humanity 2 is a ketch, 24m in length, and has the MMSI number 211192970. The ship was built in 1985 and before being sold to the NGO in 2025 it was used as a pleasure craft named Esmeralda of Southampton. Following commissioning by the NGO in mid-2026, the plan was to be deployed off the coast of Tunisia.

Following the rescue in November 2025 by Humanity 1 of 85 people, SOS Humanity reiterated the importance of launching their second rescue vessel.

== Service ==
Humanity 2 was put into service on 29 June 2026 in Sicily. The ship has crew of 10 activists and can, when loaded to the max, pick up 100 migrants. During the ceremony, NGO leader Till Rummenhohl emphasized the responsibility of the European Union for the drowned migrants in Mediterranean and vowed the new ship would also document human rights violations.

On 28 and 29 August 2026 the activists approached a boat carrying 12 migrants who had left two days before from Zuwara. A few hours later, 59 migrants were spotted in a second boat and taken on board. The crew then headed for Lampedusa to disembark the migrants. Humanity 2 was detained by Italy in Lampedusa, because the activists had apparently failed to inform the authorities about the second rescue operation before initiating it. A fine of € 4000 was issued to the NGO and the vessel was ordered to stay in port for 15 days.
