= SOS Humanity =

German NGO

SOS Humanity (from 2015 to 2021 SOS Méditerranée Germany) is a German non-profit non-governmental organization that organizes sea rescue in the Mediterranean Sea and aims to highlight the consequences of an allegedly "inhumane isolation policy of the EU". Since 2022, the association, based in Berlin, has operated the former research vessel Sea-Watch 4, under the name Humanity 1; in 2026, SOS Humanity propose to bring a second vessel into service, the Humanity 2. The association is mainly financed by donations.

== Organization ==
The association aims to rescue refugees on the Mediterranean and bring them to a place of safety. It also aims to educate the public about the situation of refugees in the Mediterranean and to document legal violations and abuses by the authorities.

SOS Humanity has its headquarters and office in Berlin, and there are also volunteer groups in various German cities. The association has 50 full members, who elect the board, consisting of four members and three assessors, at the annual general meeting. Laura Gorriahn has been chairwoman since 2019, and Till Rummenhohl has headed the office since May 2023. The office employed 21 full-time and part-time employees in 2021.

The association is a member of the German Fundraising Council, the Transparent Civil Society Initiative, and a guest member of VENRO. It receives support from, among others, Aktion Deutschland Hilft, AWO International, UNO Refugee Aid, and United4Rescue.

== Search and rescue operations ==
The search and rescue operations of the association, like those of other NGOs operating in the central Mediterranean, are carried out in accordance with international maritime law. According to this law, people in distress at sea must be immediately rescued by nearby vessels, provided with (medical) first aid and transported to a place of safety.

According to the SOLAS Convention, a UN convention on maritime safety from 1974, rescue operations in the central Mediterranean are carried out in coordination with the Maritime Rescue Coordination Centres (MRCCs) of the neighboring countries Italy, Malta and Libya. Until May 2018, Italy was de facto responsible for the coordination of all rescue operations in international waters south of Lampedusa. The Italian Maritime Rescue Coordination Center in Rome informed about boats in distress and commissioned vessels nearby, including civilian rescue vessels, to carry out the rescue. Since the transfer of the search and rescue (SAR) zone from Italy to Libya, which was officially recognized by the International Maritime Organization in June 2018, the Libyan Coast Guard, funded and supported by the EU, has taken over the coordination of rescue operations in the Libyan SAR zone.

According to the SOLAS Convention, maritime rescue organizations such as SOS Mediterranee and SOS Humanity request a safe place of disembarkation from the responsible rescue coordination center following a rescue. Those rescued at sea are brought ashore according to the instructions. However, SOS Mediterranee and SOS Humanity, citing systematic human rights violations in Libya, state that Libya cannot be considered a safe place. Refugees are imprisoned in Libya and are subjected to slavery, rape, torture, and extortion. The United Nations refugee agencies (UNHCR, IOM) also emphasize that people rescued at sea in the central Mediterranean may not be returned to Libya.

== Political commitment ==
The association aims to raise awareness of human rights violations at sea, inform the public about European migration policy, and advocate for the rights of people fleeing at sea at the political level. SOS Humanity demands that the European Union and its member states comply with international law at sea, implement an effective, state-coordinated search and rescue program, disembark rescued persons as quickly as possible at a safe and nearby location in the EU, end cooperation with third countries to combat migration, and stop obstructing civilian sea rescue.

In July 2023, the non-governmental organizations SOS Humanity, Doctors Without Borders (MSF), Oxfam Italia, the Association for Juridical Studies on Immigration (ASGI), and EMERGENCY submitted a complaint to the European Commission about Italian Law 15/2023 and the practices of the Italian authorities. They argue that the law raises serious concerns regarding its compatibility with relevant EU law and the international legal obligations of EU Member States regarding search and rescue operations at sea.

In April 2023, SOS Humanity, together with Mission Lifeline and Sea-Eye, also filed a lawsuit before the Civil Court in Rome against the systematic allocation of distant ports by the Italian authorities, which it argued was not in line with international maritime law.

In the petition "SOS in the Mediterranean. Coordinate sea rescue at European level," SOS Humanity called on the German federal government in 2023 to implement its coalition promise on sea rescue and initiate a European-coordinated sea rescue program. The petition received 62,943 signatures and was handed over to German Interior Minister Nancy Faeser on June 7, 2023.

== History ==
On May 4, 2015, SOS Mediterranee Deutschland e.V. was founded in Berlin on the initiative of captain and historian Klaus Vogel, after the Italian state rescue mission Mare Nostrum was terminated. Associations of the same name were formed in France, Italy, and Switzerland. The four associations in the European network SOS Méditerranée reportedly rescued a total of 34,631 people from distress at sea in the central Mediterranean by the end of 2021.

In 2016, SOS Mediterranee Deutschland chartered the Gibraltar-flagged Aquarius and deployed the former German Coast Guard fisheries protection vessel for sea rescue in international waters off the Libyan coast. From 2016 to 2018, the Aquarius rescued 29,523 people.

In 2019, SOS Mediterranee chartered the Ocean Viking, built in 1986. It is registered as a cargo ship and flies the Norwegian flag. Before its first sea rescue mission, the ship was converted into a rescue vessel. From 2019 to 2022, the Ocean Viking rescued 5,108 people.

In order to operate its own ship in the Mediterranean, the German association withdrew from the association at the end of 2021. Since August 2022, SOS Humanity has supplemented the civilian rescue fleet of the various sea rescue organizations with the Humanity 1. SOS Méditerranée continues to operate the Ocean Viking and continues its work in Germany as a non-profit limited liability company (GmbH).

The Humanity 1 was previously used by Sea-Watch under the name Sea-Watch 4. In July 2022, the ship was prepared in dry dock and rechristened on August 19, 2022, in Vinaròs, Spain. On board the Humanity 1 for each mission is an international crew of 28 people, some of whom are permanent employees and others are made up of a group of volunteers and an external person for media coverage. At the end of August, it set off on its first mission under its new name, during which 414 people – including 40 women, 105 unaccompanied minors, and 62 children under the age of 13 – were rescued. In total, 855 people were rescued on the Humanity 1 in 2022.

According to the aid organization, the missions are being hampered by a decree passed by the Italian government in January 2023, which was converted into Law 15/2023 in February 2023. Among other things, the law stipulates that after an initial rescue, aid organizations' ships must immediately head for a specific port assigned to them without being able to provide assistance to other boats. In addition, since December 2022, NGOs' ships have been assigned distant ports for disembarkation, which reduces the proportion of their time available to be spent in the area of operations and allows fewer rescues to take place.

In addition to Till Rummenhohl, Nina Geisler became a director of SOS Humanity in August 2025.

In 2026, SOS Humanity brought a second vessel into service, the Humanity 2; as of January 2026, the ketch was converted for use on rescue missions in Syracuse, Italy.

== Funding ==
In 2021, the association's revenue amounted to €1,886,205. Approximately 61 percent of its income came from private donations, 25 percent from grants from partner organizations such as ADRA Germany, AWO International, Help Age Germany, Islamic Relief, and others, 8 percent from donations from companies or foundations, and 6 percent from public funds. The association is a member of the German Fundraising Council, the Transparent Civil Society Initiative, and a guest member of VENRO. It receives support from, among others, Aktion Deutschland Hilft, UN Refugee Aid, and United4Rescue. The German government supported the organisation with €746,828 in 2023 and €215,000 in the first three month of 2025, before the newly elected administration stopped the financial support for civilian rescue operators in the Mediterranean.

== Awards ==
- Social Human Rights Award of the Eberhard Schultz Foundation
- 2016 Schwarzkopf-Europa-Preis
- 2016 Europäischer Bürgerpreis (European Citizen's Prize)
- 2016 Carl von Ossietzky Medal
- 2016 Civil Society Prize of the European Economic and Social Committee
- 2017 Franco-German Media Prize
- 2017 UNESCO Félix Houphouët-Boigny Peace Prize
- 2018: Nomination for the 2018 Sakharov Prize and the Nobel Peace Prize
- 2020: Nomination of founder Klaus Vogel and Sophie Beau for the Aurora Prize for Awakening Humanity
- 2021 Award of the Federal Cross of Merit for Klaus Vogel
- 2023 In 2023, the SOS Mediterranee alliance, which until 2021 included SOS Humanity, received the Right Livelihood Award, better known as the "Alternative Nobel Prize"
