= Humanitarian Pilots Initiative =

Switzerland-based non-governmental organisation

Humanitarian Pilots Initiative (HPI) is an NGO with charitable aims, with registered headquarters in Rehetobel, Switzerland. Its stated aim is to provide a focus for 'committed pilots and supporters who use their abilities for humanitarian purposes – regardless of politics, religion, ethnicity or nationality'.

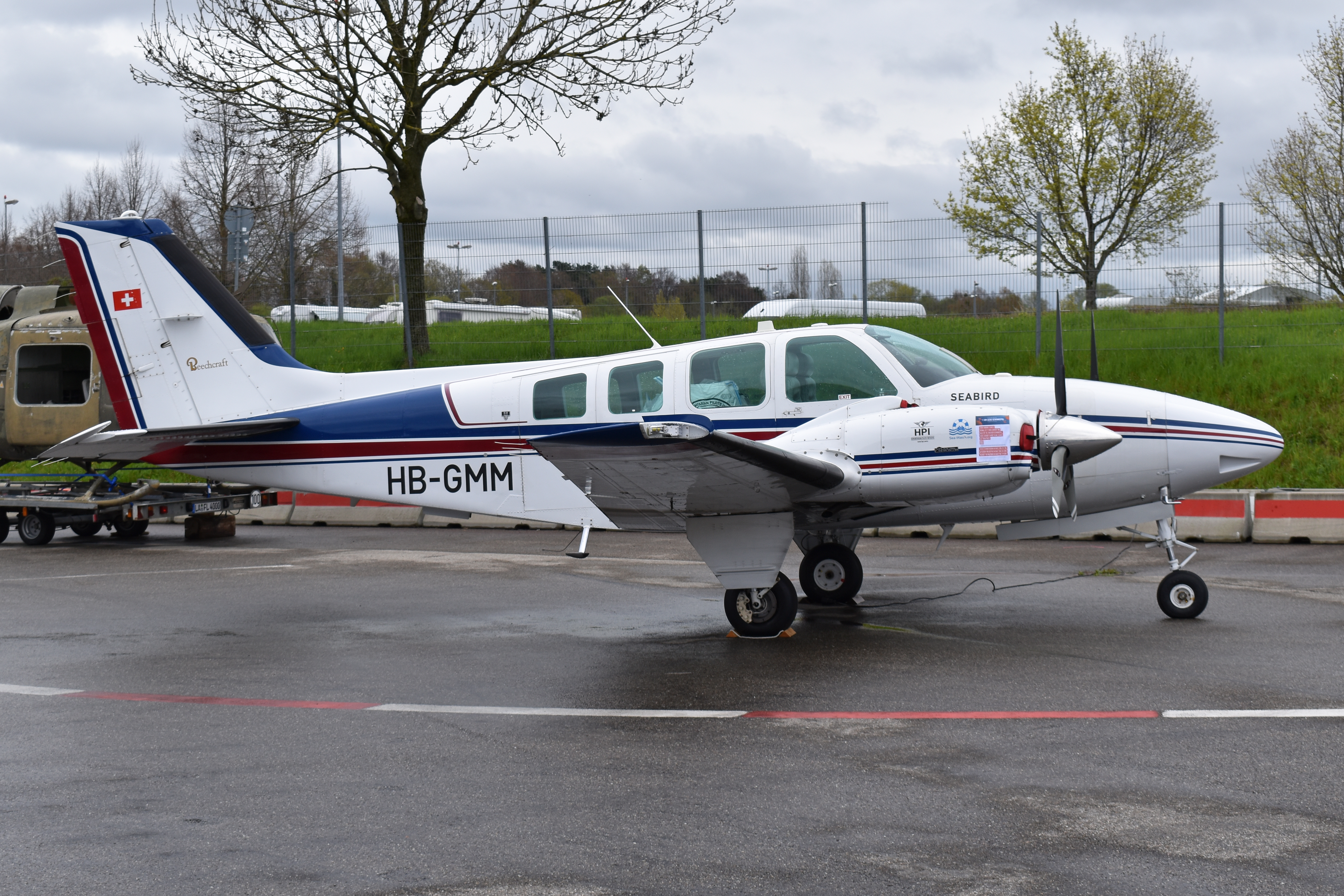
Beechcraft Baron 58 (registration HB-GMM) in 2023

== Assets ==
Since 2017, in the central Mediterranean, HPI in conjunction with Sea-Watch have operated a SAR-coordinating reconnaissance aircraft, Moonbird, a single-engined Cirrus SR22 (registration HB-KMM), and since June 2020, also the Seabird, a twin-engined high-performance Beechcraft Baron 58 (registration HB-GMM).

== Activities ==
In July 2018, Malta blocked Moonbird operations by HPI and Sea-Watch, following an incident between Italy, Malta and the charity ship Lifeline. The Times of Malta reported that HPI had been "involved in rescue of 20,000 people". The blockade lasted three months.

In June 2020, during 14 missions, 21 boats were spotted, and more than 940 migrants in distress.

In July 2020, pictures from the Moonbird showed ships apparently ignoring a vessel in distress over a period of 40 hours.

On another sortie in July 2020, observers on the Moonbird gathered evidence suggesting the involvement of Armed Forces of Malta in refoulement by the Libyan coastguard.

In September 2020, the Italian Civil Aviation authority grounded Moonbird; operations restarted in November 2020.

In March 2021, by their own estimates, HPI flew 9 missions, during which a total of some 476 people were observed in distress on 7 boats.

In June 2021, HPI's two aircraft were operating from Lampedusa, on the island of Sicily. Both aircraft were still operational in December 2021.
