= Claus-Peter Reisch =

German engineer and skipper

Claus-Peter Reisch (born April 17, 1961 in Munich), is a trained automotive mechatronics engineer, and holds a recreational seafarer's license. He was for a period the skipper of the Lifeline He became known for his work as a skipper of the Lifeline, a ship of Mission Lifeline, which picked up boat refugees from the Mediterranean and brought them to European ports.

== Life ==
Reisch originates from Landsberg am Lech and ran an industrial agency for sanitary and heating products until 2008. During a vacation in Greece in 2015, he first came into direct contact with the refugee crisis and decided to help rescue refugees from the Mediterranean. On volunteering, he found himself appointed as skipper on board a rescue ship. Reisch describes himself as a "basically [...] conservative Bavarian" and was a long-time voter for the CSU, which he had at times considered part of the "right-wing spectrum."

== Activism ==
=== Mission Lifeline ===
In April 2017, Reisch embarked on his first mission in the Mediterranean for the Regensburg-based organization Sea-Eye. He subsequently transferred to work for the Mission Lifeline organisation. After the Lifeline, commanded by Reisch, spent days in the Mediterranean in June 2018 with 230 refugees rescued from distress at sea, while Italy refused to allow the ship to dock, it was finally allowed to dock at a Maltese port.

On June 28, 2018, Reisch was arrested after arriving at a Maltese port, and the ship was detained. In the meantime, Reisch was charged in Malta. He remained free after posting a €10,000 bail, but was initially not allowed to leave the country. Reisch had to hand over his ID card to the court.

The reason given for Reisch's arrest and the detention of the Lifeline was that the ship was not properly registered. Although the ship sails under the Dutch flag, the authorities in the Netherlands denied this. Furthermore, Reisch ignored instructions from the Italian authorities to leave the rescue of the boat refugees to the Libyan coast guard. On July 11, 2018, it was announced that Reisch would be allowed to temporarily leave Malta from July 16, but would have to be back on the Mediterranean island for the continuation of the court proceedings on July 30.

If convicted, Reisch faced either a fine of 11,600 euros or one year in prison. Reisch himself saw the detention of the ship as an attempt to draw a curtain on the drama that is happening in the Mediterranean. An expert witness, however, confirmed the allegations against Reisch. He presented the court with a report stating that no documents required for the sea rescue were presented on board the ship. No documents were presented proving the ship's registration with the Dutch maritime authorities, which would mean that the "Lifeline" is considered stateless. Jan Böhmermann launched a fundraising campaign for the Lifeline's crew, which, among other things, will cover legal and expert costs. The campaign raised nearly €200,000. A fundraising campaign launched by Klaas Heufer-Umlauf raised a further €150,000.

On July 22, 2018, Reisch spoke at the #ausgehetzt demonstration against the shift to the right. There, he called for the resumption of the rescue mission in the Mediterranean. In his speech, he also addressed Chancellor Angela Merkel, requesting that she convene a conference with Archbishop Reinhard Marx, the Protestant regional bishop Heinrich Bedford-Strohm, and four non-governmental organizations to find a solution so that the sea rescuers could operate under the German flag. The Archdiocese of Munich and Freising, under Archbishop Marx, finally donated €50,000 to the Lifeline mission in October.

In mid-December 2018, some five months after the trial began, Reisch was able to testify for the first time in court in Valletta and, in a one-and-a-half-hour hearing, confirmed that he could not identify any errors in the ship's registration. Reisch had previously traveled to the island nation of Malta to attend court proceedings to no avail. The trial continued on January 11, 2019. In May, the court of first instance sentenced Reisch to pay a fine of €10,000 to local aid organizations for refugees and people in poverty. Reisch appealed the verdict, arguing that he had properly registered the Lifeline. Reisch was acquitted on appeal on January 7, 2020.

At the end of August 2019, Reisch set off again on the German-flagged pleasure craft Mission Eleonore to the sea area off the Libyan coast. The aim was not to rescue migrants, but Reisch was obligated to help in emergencies, a spokesperson for Mission Lifeline said. On August 26, he took on board around 100 people he had rescued from a sinking boat 31 nautical miles off the coast of Libya.

In January 2020, Reisch distanced himself from Mission Lifeline and announced that he would no longer participate in missions. He rejected Mission Lifeline's "political agitation," stating that much of it was too "left-wing radical" for him.

=== LandsAid ===
After visiting refugee camps in Izmir, Turkey, Reisch announced in December 2021 that he would work with the Kaufering-based aid organization LandsAid to help Syrian refugees in Turkey and combat the root causes of their flight. Reisch founded the Back To School project, which aims to provide schooling for children of Syrian refugee families in Turkey. In April 2022, Claus-Peter Reisch participated in a LandsAid aid project in Ukraine, which primarily brought food, medicine, diapers, and pet food to Ukraine.

== Awards ==
The Bavarian SPD parliamentary group in the Bavarian State Parliament decided on July 17, 2018, to award Reisch the Europe Prize. The reason given was that people like Reisch "keep the values our community stands for alive." The prize was presented on July 27, 2018, in the Bavarian State Parliament by parliamentary group leader Markus Rinderspacher.

On July 28, 2017, Reisch stated in a video interview that Landsberg's mayor, Mathias Neuner, had contacted him to discuss awarding Reisch the Landsberg Ring of Honor. Neuner stated that "awarding him the prize would divide the city council." City Councilor Stefan Meiser of the ÖDP described Neuner's actions as "outrageous behavior."

In December 2018, Reisch was awarded the Human Rights Prize by the Austrian League for Human Rights.

On April 7, 2019, Reisch together with the Mission Lifeline association received the Lew Kopelew Prize.

Reisch received the 2020 Erich Kästner Prize, endowed with 10,000 euros. He donated the money to three Dresden organizations which help refugees in the Saxon capital.

== Bibliography ==
- Claus-Peter Reisch, Udo Lindenberg: Das Meer der Tränen (The Sea of Tears). Munich Publishing Group, 2019, ISBN 978-3-7453-0789-4
