= Thies Gundlach =

Thies Gundlach (born January 17, 1956, in Lübeck, West Germany) is a retired German official of the Protestant Church in Germany (German: Evangelische Kirche in Deutschland, abbreviated EKD). From December 2010 to October 2021 he was vice-president of EKDs office.

== Early life and education ==
Thies Gundlach grew up in Lübeck. He said later that his family was not religious at all. He studied Protestant theology at the Universities of Hamburg and Tübingen and completed his vicariate at St. Catherine's Church in Hamburg. From 1985 to 1988 he was a research associate at the University of Hamburg, in the theology department, dogmatics department, where he received his doctorate in 1991 with his dissertation on God's self-limitation and human autonomy: Karl Barth's church dogmatics as a step towards modernizing Protestant theology.

== Career ==
From December 1990 he served as pastor together with his first wife, Birgitta Heubach-Gundlach, at the St. Johannis Church in Hamburg-Harvestehude. From 2001 to 2010 he headed the department for church activities in the Church Office of the Protestant Church in Germany (EKD).

An internal paper that reached the press in October 2009, in which Gundlach judged the situation of the Catholic Church in Germany, in some sharp words, attracted particular attention.

In 2010, Gundlach became one of the three vice presidents of EKD church office (EKD Kirchenamt). Gundlach was one of the leading minds behind the EKD's "Church on the Move" reform process. Gundlach retired in 2022.

At the end of 2019, Gundlach took over the chairmanship of the association United4Rescue, which was set up to act as the sponsor for a Protestant initiative to send a sea rescue ship to the Mediterranean.

Gundlach is co-editor of JS magazine. JS-Magazine - the protestant magazine for young soldiers is a monthly German military journal that has been published since 1986.

== Personal life ==
Gundlach is in a relationship with the Green Party politician and former church official Katrin Göring-Eckardt. He has a son and a daughter from his first marriage to Hamburg pastor Birgitta Heubach-Gundlach, who died in 2017.
