= United4Rescue =

United4Rescue – Gemeinsam Retten e. V. (United4Rescue – Saving Together e. V.) is a German association supporting civilian sea rescue in the Mediterranean. The association supports and facilitates the purchase and conversion of rescue vessels, the acquisition of equipment, and the financing of operational costs. It is supported by a large alliance of numerous civil society organizations.

Since its founding in 2019, United4Rescue has played a key role in the purchase of four rescue vessels (Humanity 1, Sea-Eye 4, Sea-Watch 5, and Sea-Eye 5) and a reconnaissance aircraft. In addition to supporting these four alliance vessels and other civilian sea rescue organizations in the Mediterranean, the association also provides emergency aid for life-saving projects along the entire EU external border, such as the Polish-Belarusian border, the Balkan route, the English Channel, and Greece.

== Foundation of the Association ==
The founding of United4Rescue in November 2019 was based on a resolution passed at the Protestant Church Congress in June 2019. There, the deployment of a rescue ship from the Evangelical Church in Germany to the Mediterranean was demanded, and around 40,000 supporters were mobilized. The Evangelical Church then decided to work with other non-governmental organizations to purchase a rescue ship to rescue refugees in the Mediterranean.

The phrase "Man lässt keine Menschen ertrinken. Punkt" (translated "You don't let people drown. Period") also originates from the 2019 Evangelical Church Congress. It was part of Sandra Bils' closing sermon and is the association's motto.

== United4Rescue – Association and Alliance ==
United4Rescue – Gemeinsam Retten e. V. is an independent, non-profit association. It is behind the alliance of the same name with almost a thousand organizations, which highlights the broad social support for civilian sea rescue. Civilian sea rescue organizations such as Sea-Watch, SOS Humanity, and Sea-Eye are close partners.

Founded in 2019, the association collects donations with the help of the alliance, donors, and supporting members to specifically support aid projects in the Mediterranean and, in some cases, at the EU's external borders. The association has 11 members who have long been committed to civilian sea rescue. The association's office is responsible for operational business: project support, campaign work, fundraising, public relations, and alliance support. Together with delegated association members, the office decides on the allocation of funding.

United4Rescue – Gemeinsam Retten e. V. has been operating since September 2022. V. Supporting association of the Moving Cities project. Moving Cities presents online European cities and networks that exemplify solidarity-based migration policies. The project is fully funded by the Robert Bosch Stiftung and the Rosa Luxemburg Stiftung and is financially independent and autonomous.

== The United4Rescue Alliance ==
When it was founded in 2019, the alliance consisted primarily of church organizations. Numerous civil society institutions quickly joined: Today, organizations such as ProAsyl, Campact, Doctors Without Borders, and the German Trade Union Confederation (DGB) are part of the alliance, as are counseling centers, daycare centers, and companies. From its initial base of 150 organizations, the alliance has now grown to almost a thousand alliance partners. The alliance advocates for civilian sea rescue in public and aims to raise awareness of the broad social support for civilian sea rescue. Many alliance partners donate, organize information evenings, discussion groups, and creative fundraising campaigns, or recruit additional alliance partners. The alliance supports four demands:

- Compulsory sea rescue
- No criminalization
- Fair asylum procedures
- Enable safe ports.

== The alliance fleet of United4Rescue ==
As a support association, United4Rescue has so far supported the purchase of four rescue ships and a reconnaissance aircraft in cooperation with various rescue organizations. Under the slogan "We're sending a ship," the Poseidon, a former research vessel of the Geomar Helmholtz Centre for Ocean Research, was auctioned on January 31, 2020, and handed over to the Sea-Watch organization, which operated the ship for two years under the name Sea-Watch 4 supported by United4Rescue. This ship was handed over to the sea rescue organization SOS Humanity in 2022 and has since sailed under the name Humanity 1. At the end of 2020, United4Rescue contributed €434,000 to the purchase of the Sea-Eye 4 (2020 Annual Report). In 2023, the association supported the purchase of the Sea-Watch 5 with €200,000. In 2024, the Sea-Eye 5, formerly a DGzRS rescue boat, was purchased as a smaller and faster rescue boat in cooperation with the rescue organization Sea-Eye for €465,000. In 2025, the alliance contributed €170,000 to the purchase of the Seabird 3 reconnaissance aircraft, operated by Sea-Watch and the Humanitarian Pilots Initiative (HPI). In spring 2025, Sea-Eye e.V. handed over the SEA-EYE 4 to the Italian organization Mediterranean Saving Humans. The rescue vessel will now operate under the name MEDITERRANEA.

== Funding Criteria of United4Rescue ==
The association's statutes stipulate that, in principle, only projects that serve the purpose of saving human lives or providing assistance to those persecuted for political, racial, or religious reasons, as well as to refugees and displaced persons, can be funded.

The focus of funding is on supporting civilian sea rescue in the Mediterranean. This funding primarily covers the financing of ships and rescue operations, the procurement of necessary rescue equipment, provisions and equipment, as well as the costs of repairs, conversions, and shipyard stays. United4Rescue also occasionally supports aid projects on land.

Project funding is always decided based on the following funding criteria:

"Danger to life: Rescuing people in life-threatening situations

- Urgency: Acute financial constraints for projects that contribute to saving lives
- Professionalism: Projects that are carefully and effectively planned and implemented. In addition to the operational concept, this includes realistic, sustainable financial planning that, for example, guarantees the operating costs of a rescue vessel after purchase.
- Proportional support: The total financing of a project, including all costs, equity, and co-funding, must be reflected in the funding application.
- United4Rescue only funds projects pro rata and does not cover the entire project costs.
- External communication: Funded projects are presented publicly to report on their work and to promote other projects.

== Government Support for Civil Sea Rescue ==
In November 2022, the Bundestag's Budget Committee decided to support civil sea rescue with €2 million per year for four years. This marks the first time a German government has financially supported civil sea rescue.

After several discussions regarding a potential cooperation with United4Rescue as the funding organization, the Federal Foreign Office decided in the summer of 2023 to coordinate the funding itself.

== Reception ==
The founding of United4Rescue was accompanied by a controversial public debate.

In a column in Focus, journalist Ulrich Reitz argued that the church initiative was in a moral grey area. In August 2020, he commented that the Protestant Church was not concerned with the consequences of its action—neither the costs, the social consequences, nor the integration burdens that followed the rescues. Reitz viewed the church initiative as an attack on Europe's governments and noted that governments could always fall back on having received a mandate from voters not to accept any more refugees.

Frank Mathwig, a theologian and ethicist at the University of Bern, welcomed the church's commitment as an ethical program that was "more than honorable and worthy of support". Saving human lives is "at the core of the church's biblically based self-image."

Hamburg's Deputy Mayor, Katharina Fegebank, and Palermo's Mayor, Leoluca Orlando, expressed support for the alliance's demand that European municipalities should be allowed to accept additional refugees at their own discretion, a decision that can currently only be made by national governments.

Heinrich Bedford-Strohm, Chairman of the Council of the Evangelical Church in Germany, received death threats in connection with the commitment to sea rescue. He defended himself against accusations, saying that this had "nothing to do with political activism, but with the core of Christian faith and action."
