= Sea-Watch 5 =

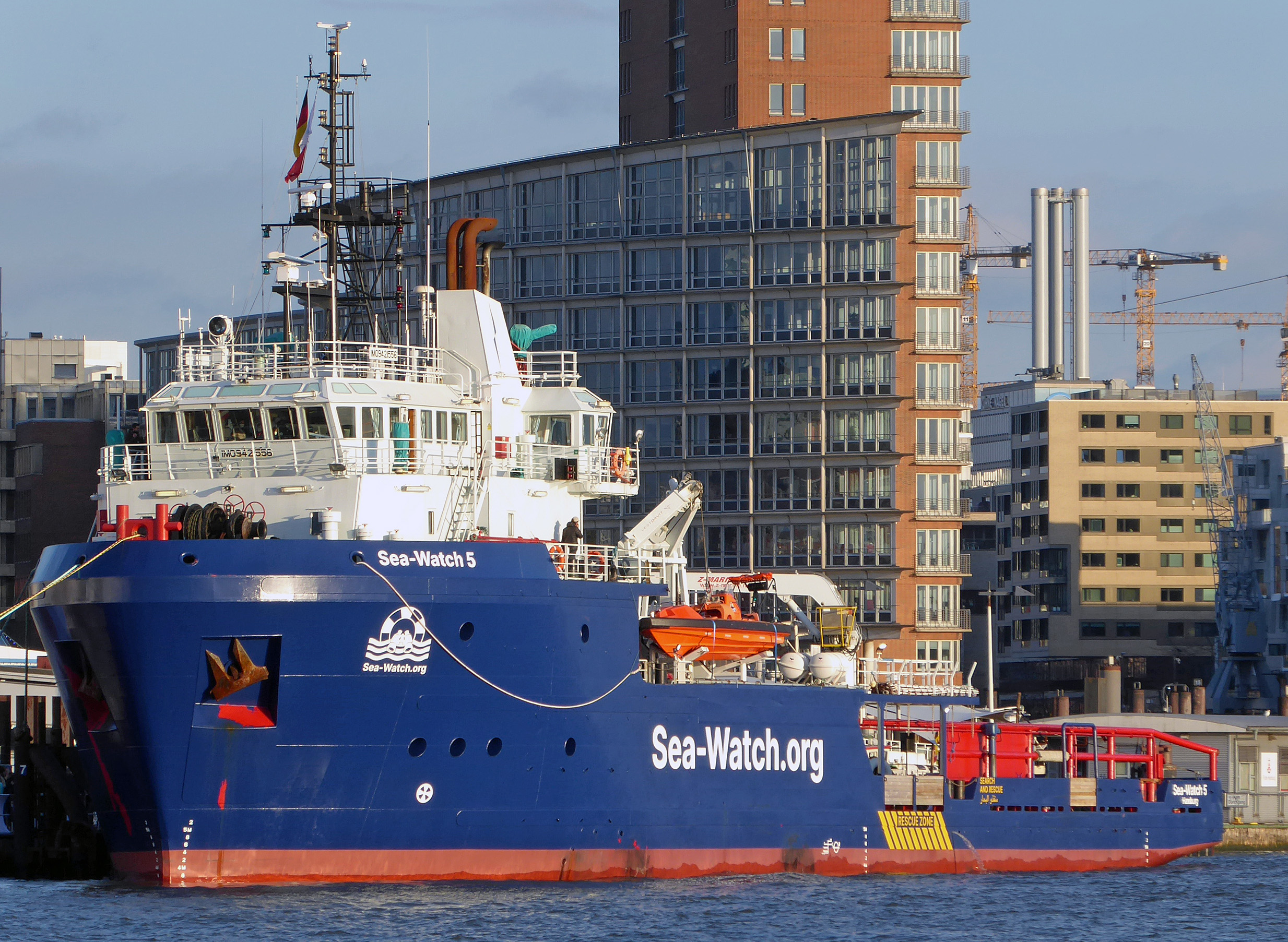
Sea-Watch 5 2022 in Hamburg

Sea-Watch 5 is a former Norwegian supply ship for wind power and oil platforms. It was converted for a SAR role by the NGO Sea-Watch and used in the Mediterranean sea since 2023 to rescue migrants.

== History ==
The ship was built in 2010 by Sealink Engineering & Slipway (Malaysia) and commissioned as Bravo Topaz. It sailed under the names Roxanne 42 (2010–2018) and Ocean Don (2018–2022). In 2022, the ship was acquired by the Sea-Watch association for 4.5 million euros and christened as Sea-Watch 5 in Hamburg in early November. The ship was converted in Flensburg during a period running until October 2023. According to the association, the conversions were delayed due to, among other things, strict fire safety regulations.

== Vessel details ==
The ship is 58.3 metres (191 ft) long and 13.8 metres (45 ft) wide and has been redesigned for its rescue role to accommodate up to 500 people. It has a gross tonnage of 1,452 and is equipped with two 4,400 kilowatts (5,900 hp) Cummins diesel engines for main engines.

== Operations ==
In December 2023, around six weeks after its commissioning, the Sea-Watch 5 rescued around 100 people in distress in the Mediterranean during its first missions in international waters and provided them with first aid on board.

In May 2025 the ship rescued 190 people from the sea and delivered them to the port of Marina di Carrara in Tuscany.

In late September 2025 the activists claimed to be 40 nautical miles off the Libiyan coast when they picked up some 66 migrants from a fiberglass boat at night. The captain steered that boat back to Libya after the migrants were on Sea-Watch 5. A Libyan coast guard vessel later approached Sea-Watch 5 and demanded them to leave the area, with some crewmembers hearing a gunshot from the Libyan vessel. On their way back they picked up another group of migrants and finally landed 124 migrants from Bangladesh and Sudan in Italy.

On 12 December 2025 the activists picked up 69 migrants in the Strait of Sicily in two operations and were given La Spezia as port to disembark them. Minors were allowed by Italian authorities to leave earlier in Pantelleria.

On 24 January 2026 the activists picked up 18 migrants in international waters and headed for Italy. The ship was detained by Italian authorities after disembarking the migrants in Catania and Sea Watch was fined 7,500 Euro for not coordinating with the Libyan coastguard. The detention was overturned by a court in Catania in February 2026.

On 18 March 2026 the activists again cited an emergency to ignore Italian authorities designated port Marina di Carrara for disembarking and headed for Trapani instead to unload some 100 migrants they had picked up earlier. Sea-Watch was also found to have not coordinated with the Libyan coastguard during the rescue. Sea Watch was fined 10,000 Euro and Sea-Watch 5 was impounded for 20 days.

By 13 May 2026 the Sea-Watch 5 had picked up a total of 166 migrants in several separate rescue operations and headed back to Italy. The activists claimed to have been threatened by Libyan authorities during their stay off the Libyan coast with patrol boats firing machine guns in their direction. The Sea-Watch 5 crew was investigated by Italian authorities for "Facilitation of illegal entry" and the ship was searched after its arrival in Brindisi. The investigation was apparently based around the events on 12 May 2026, when the crew of Sea Watch 5 claimed to look for a lost boat of migrants, while Frontex surveillance and video evidence filmed by migrants themselves showed the activists were directly approached by smugglers on a speedboat, who handed the migrants over to a Sea Watch 5 boat.

The ship was moved to the port of Taranto and the captain, commanding the May 2026 operation, dutch national Anne van Dam, is being investigated by the public prosecutor's office for aiding illegal entry. Sea Watch replaced him as captain for the duration of the investigation.

On 12 July 2026 the activists approached Carrara to deliver 50 migrants who had been picked up earlier in the Southern Mediterranean.

On 17 August 2026 the activists disembarked 6 migrants at Naples. Two Pakistanis and 4 Iranians who had been picked up on 13 August. For not coordinating with the Libyan coastguard Sea-Watch 5 was detained for 45 days and the activists were fined 7,500 Euro. An initial objection by the NGO was accepted by a court in Naples in mid September. An additional hearing is scheduled in October.

Between 11 October and 12 October 2026 Sea-Watch 5 conducted several operations: On 11 October the Sea-Watch activists headed towards a migrant boat, reported earlier by the NGO aircraft "Albatross". Sea-Watch 5 picked up 28 people from the allegedly already sinking boat. The activists claimed to have been threatend by a Libyan costguard vessel during the operation and were hiding under deck until the vessel retreated. Shortly afterwards, 51 migrants were picked up from a second boat, which was also reported to be in a sinking condition. A third boat with 72 migrants was intercepted on 12 October near an oil platform. Italian authorities assigned Civitavecchia to disembark the 151 migrants.

The crew conducted three rescue operations and had picked up 101 migrants by 20 October 2026. Italian authorities assigned Crotone as port for disembarkation.
