= MRV Alba-Na-Mara =

Scottish research ship

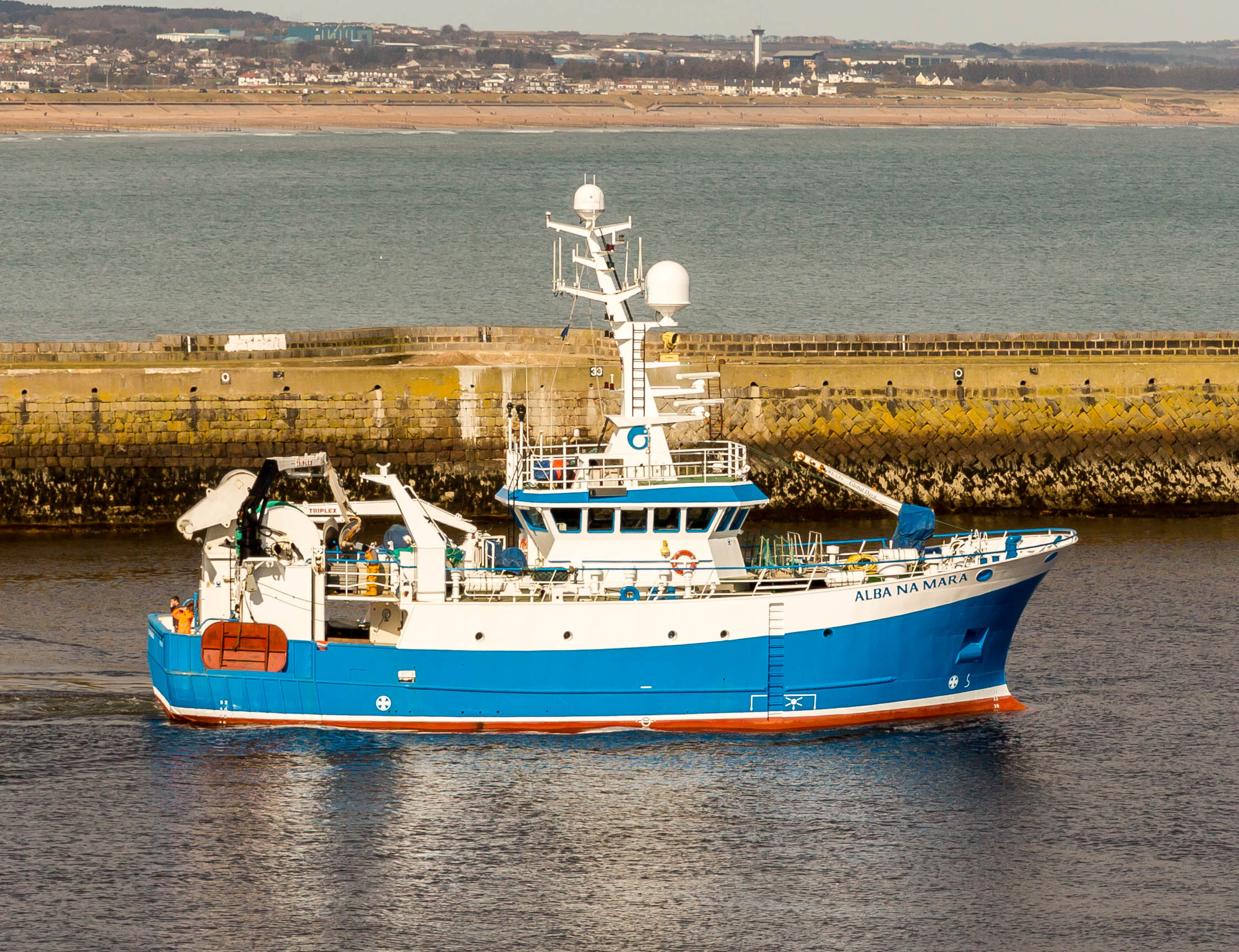

History

Flag of Scotland
- Name: Alba-Na-Mara
- Namesake: Scotland of the sea
- Builder: Macduff Shipyards
- Launched: 2008
- Homeport: Fraserburgh
- Identification: IMO number: 9378668; MMSI number: 235059857; callsign: 2AIE4
- Status: In service

General characteristics
- Class & type: MCA Category 1. Research trawler/dredger
- Tonnage: 163 GT
- Length: 27 m (88 ft 7 in)
- Beam: 8.6 m (28 ft 3 in)
- Draught: 4.3 m (14 ft 1 in)
- Installed power: Mitsubishi S6R MPTKFx2 630 hp @ 1600rpm
- Propulsion: Twin propeller
- Speed: 9 knots (17 km/h; 10 mph) (max 16kn)
- Endurance: 14 days
- Complement: 8 crew + 5 scientists

Marine Research Vessel (MRV) Alba-Na-Mara is a small marine and fisheries research vessel, operated by the Marine Scotland directorate of the Scottish Government.

Primarily operating in the inshore zone, Alba na Mara collects data on fish, Nephrops and scallop stocks.

== History ==
Alba-Na-Mara was commissioned in 2008. She replaced FRV Clupea which had been in operation with FRS for 40 years.

== Layout ==
Alba-Na-Mara is equipped with a sophisticated range of deck machinery and electronics. She is capable of carrying out fisheries research, single, twin, pelagic/demersal/trawling and scallop dredging, hydrographic sampling, surveying and camera work up to 150 miles offshore.
