= Bennet Birnie Rae =

Scottish marine zoologist (1906–1998)

Bennet Birnie Rae FRSE (1906–1998) was a 20th century marine zoologist specialising in the diet of fish.

== Early life and career ==
He was born in Aberdeenshire in 1906 into a family of six children, including William Lorimer Rae (1892–1970) the son of Christian and John Rae.

In 1933, he began working for the Fishery Board for Scotland.

He rose to be Assistant Director of the Marine Laboratory at Aberdeen.

== Family ==
He married Sophia Hutchison Kennedy around 1935.

== Publications ==
- Description of a Giant Squid stranded near Aberdeen (1950)
- The Food of the Megrim (1963)
- The Lemon Sole (1965)
- The Food of Cod in Icelandic Waters (1968)
- The Food of Seals in Scottish Waters (1968)
- The Food of Cormorants and Shags (1969)
- The Food of the Witch (1969)
- The Distribution of Flatfishes in Scottish and Adjacent Water (1971)
- The Cod-Worm Problem in the North Sea (1972)
