= Sea-Watch 4 =

Former German research ship

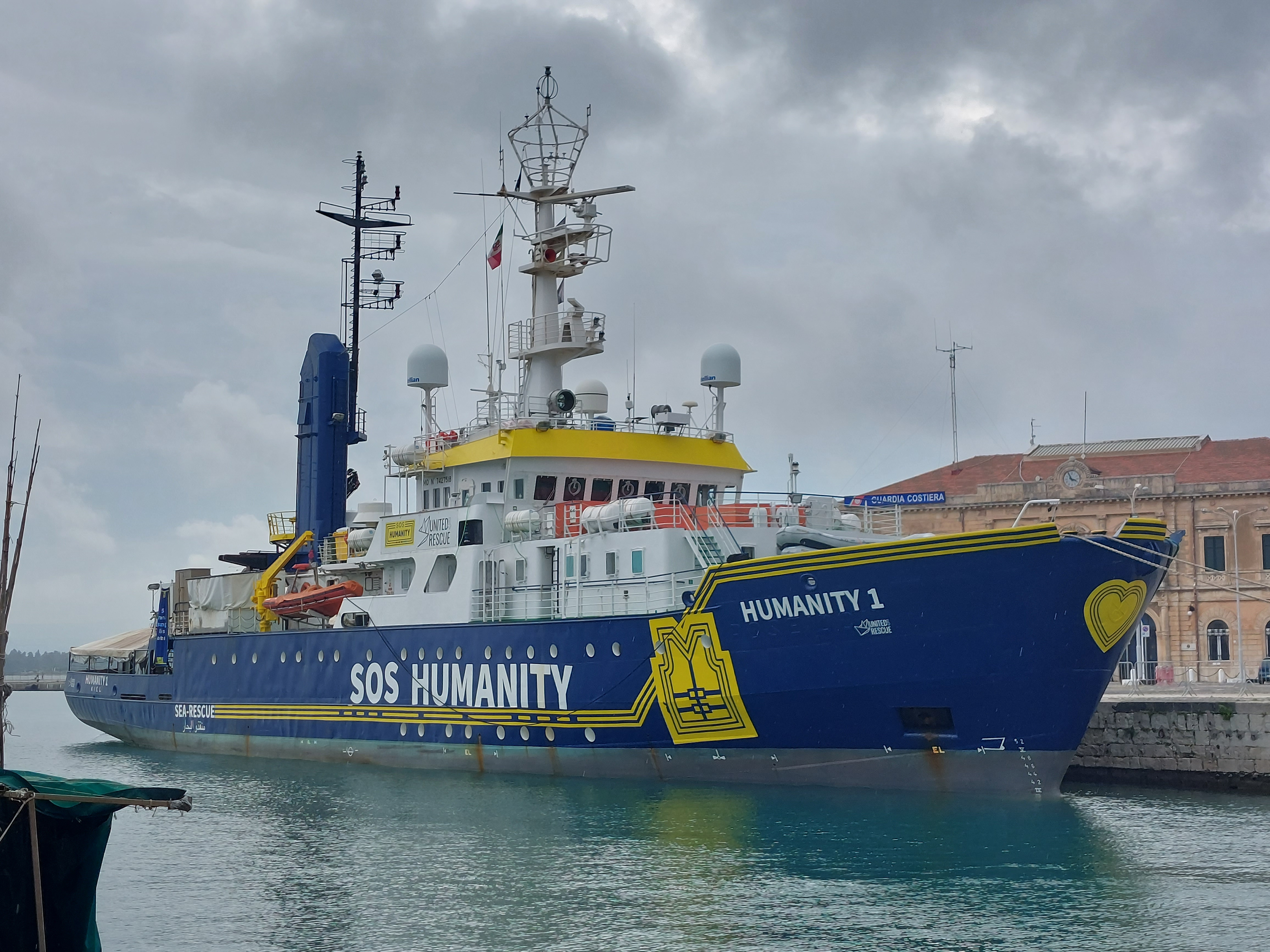
Humanity 1 in Siracuse

The Humanity 1 is a German Search and Rescue Ship. The former German research ship is owned by SOS Humanity, who use the ship for SAR operations of refugees in distress on the Mediterranean Sea. Previously, the ship was owned by Sea-Watch e. V., and prior to that by the GEOMAR Helmholtz Centre for Ocean Research Kiel (GEOMAR) operated the ship under the name of Poseidon, after the Greek god of the sea, with the State of Schleswig-Holstein as the owner. In January 2020 the ship was auctioned and bought by Sea-Watch e. V. and renamed Sea-Watch 4 on 20 February 2020; the ship was further re-named, to Humanity 1, in August 2022.

== Description ==
The ship is 61 metres (200 ft) in length and has IMO number 7427518.

The ship was able to stay at sea as a research vessel for around three weeks and had an operational radius of around 4,200 nautical miles. The area of operation was limited to the Atlantic Ocean and its marginal seas. The ship was used for oceanographic, marine biological, geological and geophysical research. The ship had five laboratories (including a wet laboratory, dry laboratory and chemical laboratory) and was equipped with winches, cranes (including an NMF working crane for loads of up to 5 tonnes and a stern boom from MacGregor that could be swivelled by 85 ° for loads of up to 5 tonnes ) as well as various hydroacoustic systems, including a multi-beam echo sounder.

The ship is powered by diesel-electric technology. The fixed propeller, which is equipped with a Becker rudder, is driven by an electric motor from the manufacturer Lloyd Dynamowerke with an output of 930 kW at 280 rpm. Three diesel-powered generators are available to generate electricity. The ship was originally built with two diesel-powered generators, and another diesel generator set was installed in the early 1980s. This expanded the range and operational area of the ship, which could now also sail the open North Atlantic. There is also an auxiliary and port diesel.

The diesel engines were replaced at the beginning of the 21st century by MTU diesel engines of the 12V2000M type, each with an output of 575 kW at 1500 rpm. A little later, the diesel engine driving the auxiliary and harbor generator was also replaced by a Scania DI12/62M diesel engine with an output of 280 kW.

The ship is equipped with a bow thruster designed as a water jet drive with 290 kW of power at 500 rpm. It has a fin stabilizer that reduces the roll of the ship while in motion.

The crew of the research vessel was 15 people. Scientists had eleven places in five double and one single cabin.

The open working deck behind the superstructure is around 135 m^{2}. A 20-foot and a 10-foot container could also be carried on the deck.

== History ==
The ship was built in 1975/76, under construction number 2266 at the Schichau Unterweser shipyard in Bremerhaven. The keel was laid on 4 November 1975, and the launch took place on 2 May 1976. The ship was completed in August 1976, and on 30 August 1976 the ship was put into service. The construction of the ship cost around 23 million DM and was financed 90% from funds from the Federal Ministry of Education and Research (Germany) (BMFT) and 10% from funds from the State of Schleswig-Holstein. The ship was operated by the Kiel Institute for Oceanography until 2003 and then by the Institut für Meereskunde Kiel, IFM-GEOMAR, (created through the merger of the Institute for Oceanography and the GEOMAR Research Center of Kiel University), which on 1 January 2012 became the GEOMAR Helmholtz Center for Ocean Research Kiel. The ship was managed by Briese Schiffahrt in Leer.

The Poseidon was the second German research ship with this name. From 1902 to 1938 there was a research ship Poseidon, the Reichsforschungsdampfer Poseidon, measuring 481 GRT, which was mainly used for fisheries research in the seas of the European shelf.

GEOMAR still operates the research vessel Alkor as well as the research cutter Littorina and the boat FB Polarfuchs, which originally served as a laboratory together with the research vessel Polarstern (built 1982).

In 2022, the research vessel Meteor IV was ordered at Meyer Werft and Fassmer to replace the Meteor and the Poseidon in 2026.

== Acquisition by Sea Watch ==
In September 2019, the ship was put up for sale by VEBEG. In December, the ship was decommissioned after over 43 years and 539 expeditions. As a research vessel, the ship is to be replaced by a new build, the Meteor, in 2024.

On 31 January 2020, Sea-Watch e.V., with the support of the United4Rescue alliance and the Evangelical Church in Germany, bought the ship for around 1.547 million euros, for use to rescue migrants from distress in the Mediterranean. The ship was renamed on 20 February 2020 as Sea-Watch 4. Regional Bishop Heinrich Bedford-Strohm vowed that the church would assist with operation of Sea-Watch 4.

== Acquisition by SOS Humanity ==
In August 2022, the ship was acquired by SOS Humanity and renamed Humanity 1.

== Conversion for rescue operations ==
After being converted into a rescue ship, the ship has a crew of 26 people. Up to 300 refugees can be taken in, in extreme emergencies up to 900 for a short time. A separate area with 24 beds is available for women and children. In addition, an infirmary with two treatment places was set up. The kitchen, in which food can be prepared for over 100 passengers, was taken over from the research ship.

== Rescue operations ==
=== As Sea-Watch 4 ===
The activists set out on their mission on 15 August 2020 from the Spanish port of Burriana in the province of Castellón and headed for the central Mediterranean. On 22 August they took over seven people from another rescue ship off Libya in the sea area off Tripoli and the smugglers' stronghold of az-Zawiya. Italian media identified this second ship as a former speedboat of the French customs (DF 42), which is now operated as Louise Michel, also by German activists under the German flag and which had been anchored days earlier together with the Sea-Watch 4 in Burriana. Another 97 people were brought on board on 23 August followed by around 100 migrants the following day. Several EU states and the Red Cross then negotiated about the landing of the migrants in the European Union. The ship was finally allowed to call at Palermo, where the 353 migrants were transferred to the GNV Allegra ferry on 2 September for a two-week quarantine.

=== As Humanity 1 ===
According to their own information, the crew of the Humanity 1 rescued 200 boat migrants from distress at sea on December 2 and 3, 2023 and brought them to the southern Italian port city of Crotone. The Italian authorities then detained the ship. The blockade is valid for 20 days and a fine of 3,333 euros has also been imposed. The operating organization wants to take legal action and sue against the arrest in the port city in Calabria.

In December 2025 Humanity 1 was put under detention and fined 10,000 euros by authorities for 20 days for not coordinating rescue efforts with the Libyan coastguard.

On 13 February 2026 the activists picked up 33 migrants. They did not coordinate with the Libyan Rescue Coordination Center, citing potential Human rights violations and Humanity 1 headed for Italy instead. Italian authorities put the ship under detention in Trapani for 60 Days and fined the NGO with 10,000 euros.

On 7 June 2026 the ship landed 47 migrants in Civitavecchia who had been picked up in the days before in the rescue zone near Malta. The activists complained having been sent to the distant port, losing time, which could have otherwise been used for additional rescue operations.

Mid August 2026 the crew picked up 73 migrants between Malta and Lampedusa. They were assigned the port of Ravenna in northern Italy to disembark them.

Between 13 and 14 October 2026 the activists picked up 80 migrants off the Tunisian coast. After evacuating 32 in need of medical attention at Palermo, the port of Savona was assigned to disembark the remaining migrants by Italian authorities.
