= Lifeline (ship) =

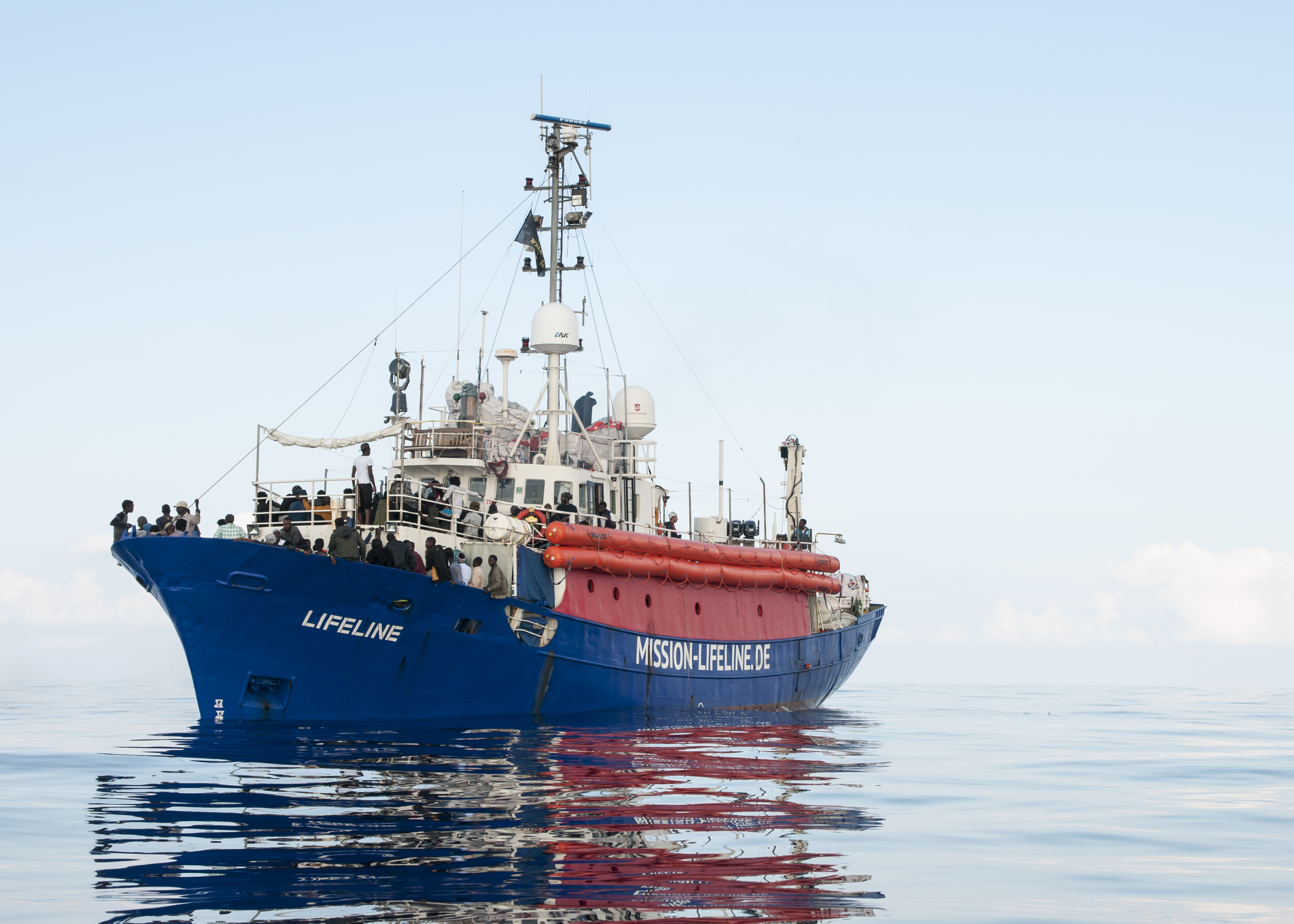
- Lifeline (21 June 2018)

History

Disputed
- Name: Lifeline
- Namesake: Clupea
- Builder: Hall, Russell & Company, Aberdeen
- Yard number: 940
- Laid down: 1968
- Launched: 25 July 1968
- Refit: 1988
- Home port: Amsterdam
- Identification: IMO number: 6825842; MMSI number: 244870698; Callsign: PD8224
- Fate: Detained by Maltese authorities
- Notes: Ownership, ship classification and Home Port documentation not in order as of June 2018, Lying at Malta

General characteristics
- Type: "Rescue" vessel
- Displacement: 381.68 t (376 long tons)
- Length: 32.1 m (105 ft 4 in)
- Beam: 7.39 m (24 ft 3 in)
- Draught: 3.51 m (11 ft 6 in)
- Propulsion: Lister Blackstone ERS 8M 492 kW (660 hp)
- Speed: 11.5 knots (13.2 mph; 21.3 km/h)
- Endurance: 12 days
- Complement: 16

Lifeline is a small rescue boat, formerly an inshore fisheries research vessel of the Fisheries Research Services currently seized by Maltese authorities due to disputed ownership, ship classification, home port documentation and flag registration. The captain, Claus-Peter Reisch appeared in a Maltese court charged with commanding an improperly registered ship and was released on a 10,000-euro bail.

== History ==
Clupea was commissioned in 1968. Measuring 32 m (100 ft) and drawing 3.5 m (11 ft 6 in), she is a good size for conducting research inside the constricted space of a sea loch. For research in offshore areas and the North Sea, the larger, more modern, FRV Scotia was used.

Clupea was replaced by MRV Alba-Na-Mara after the latter's launch in 2008. She has been sold to a private company.

== Clupea ==
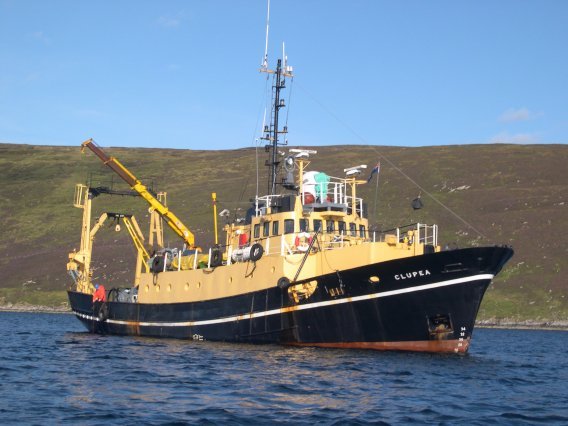
FRV Clupea operating in a Scottish sea loch

As Clupea she was equipped with winches, reel drums and an A-frame, allowing her to tow a range of fishing gear. Deck cranes allow the deployment of water sampling equipment and benthic grabs.

She was based at the port of Fraserburgh and operated mainly on the Scottish west coast on behalf of the Scottish Executive.

As a small vessel requiring space for equipment and laboratories, Clupea had only accommodation for four officers, six crew and six scientists.

== As Sea-Watch 2 ==
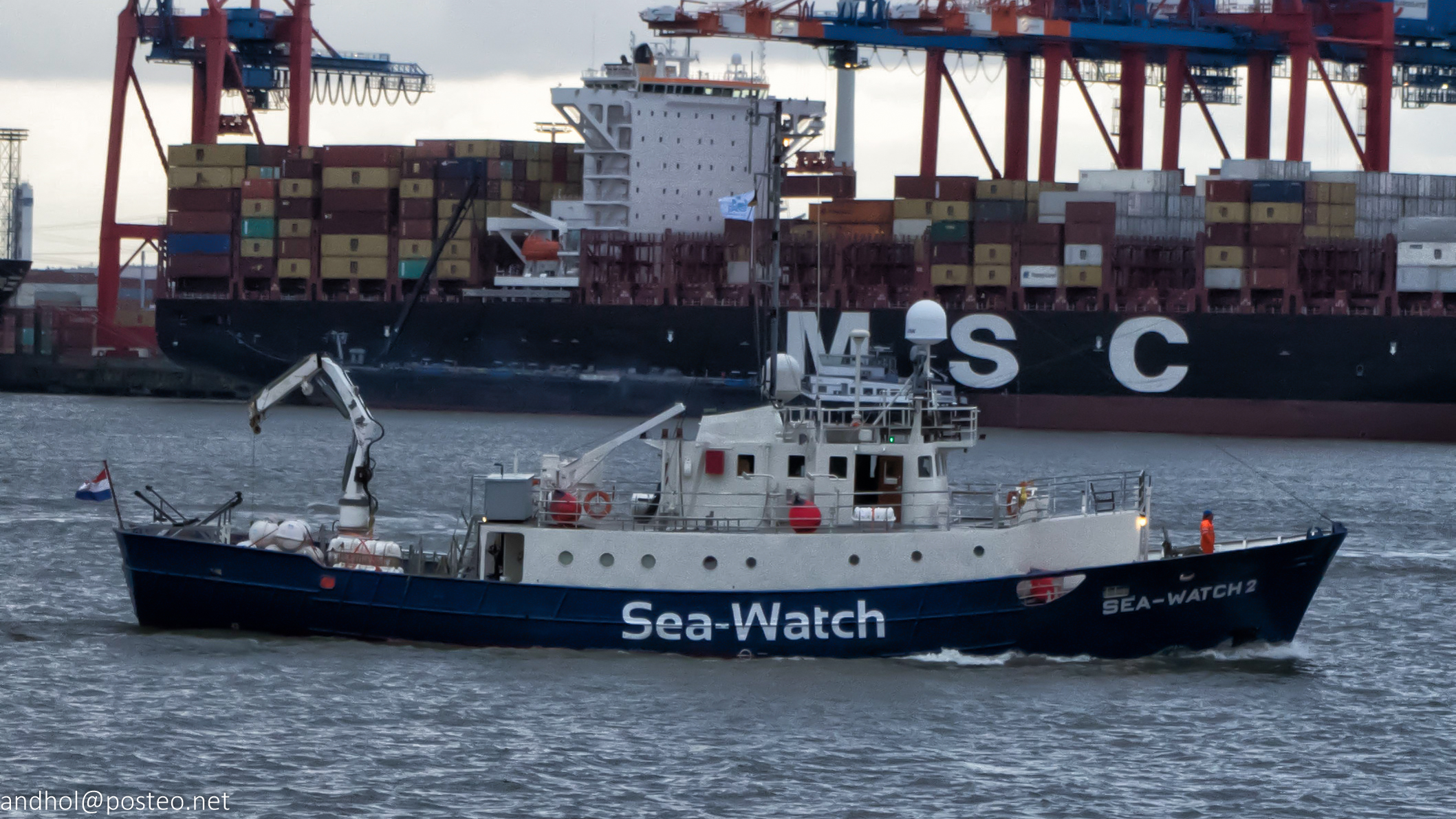
The rebuilt Sea-Watch 2 leaving Hamburg in March 2016

In 2015 Clupea was sold to the German NGO Sea-Watch, who started a civil sea rescue service for refugees and migrants in the Mediterranean. The vessel was renamed Sea-Watch 2 in March 2016 and has been used for search and rescue (SAR) missions.

== As Lifeline ==
In autumn 2016, the NGO Sea Watch sold the ship to Mission Lifeline e.V., a service club based in Dresden. Its name now is Lifeline. In June 2018, the Lifeline (with 239 migrants on board) was in the media as one of the ships being forbidden to enter an Italian harbour. Matteo Salvini, then Italian Minister of the Interior (Conte Cabinet), had ordered this blocking.

Netherlands Minister Cora van Nieuwenhuizen declared in late June 2018, that the Lifeline does not operate under the Netherlands flag. According to the statement, the existing registration of the vessel with the Koninklijk Nederlands Watersport Verbond was only a proof of ownership, which did not make the Netherlands the flag state for the Lifeline. The Lifeline was impounded by the Maltese authorities in summer 2018. In January 2020, captain Claus-Peter Reisch had his conviction for entering Maltese waters 'without the necessary registration or licence' quashed and a €10,000 fine revoked.

The activists sold the ship in early 2020 for a "low five-figure sum" and announced to use the profits to help equip a new rescue ship.
