= Mission Lifeline =

Sea rescue organization

Mission Lifeline is an association from Dresden, founded in 2016, whose purpose is to rescue people whose lives are endangered, at sea on the Mediterranean and elsewhere, and on land. Initially, the ship Lifeline was used for sea rescues, and until the end of August 2019 the Mission Eleonore. From October 2021 to December 2023, Mission Lifeline operated the ship Rise Above. Mission Lifeline have also reached out to help in Afghanistan and Ukraine.

== Founding ==
The association was founded in May 2016 by Axel Steier and other colleagues. According to its own information, it emerged from the Dresden-Balkan convoy, which in October 2015 collected donations in kind for the people on the Balkan route, and took them to Preševo (Serbia) in mid-November with small trucks, Here, they distributed them with the help of volunteers. Further aid convoys to Idomeni and the registration camp on the island of Chios followed. In addition to collecting donations in kind for the aid measures in Greece, an account was set up to allow financial donations.

With the closure of the Balkan route, the escape route across the Mediterranean Sea became increasingly used. "This is how MISSION LIFELINE e.V., which has been planning and preparing the deployment of a rescue ship in the central Mediterranean since April 2016, emerged from the Dresden-Balkan convoy."

=== Air-bridge ===
In mid-March 2020, the activists collected money to rent an airplane, and want to bring 100 underage migrants from the Moria refugee camp on Lesbos to Berlin.

== Mediterranean deployment ==
=== Lifeline ===
In 2017, 200,000 euros in donations were raised to purchase the Sea-Watch 2 and the ship was put into operation as Lifeline.

After the Lifeline was confiscated in summer 2018, the activists collected 475,000 euros in donations to buy a new ship by mid-October 2018, including funds from the Catholic Church (initiated by Archbishops Reinhard Marx and Hans-Josef Becker) and the music group Die Fantastischen Vier.

The mission in the Mediterranean began in September 2017. A rescue operation in June 2018 caused a sensation in which the Lifeline ship with 230 refugees on board had to wait six days before it was allowed to dock in Malta after it had previously been turned away in Italy.

=== Eleonore ===
At the end of October 2018, the group sent a 'sailing boat' with a crew of seven activists flying the German flag into the waters off the Libyan coast.

Benjamin Hartmann, owner of the statement fashion label HUMAN BLOOD, officially acted as the buyer for the purchase of the fishing boat Eleonore in May 2019. The subsequent conversion to a rescue ship was financed by the donor and Mission Lifeline. According to the association's founder, Axel Steier, it was necessary to use a 'straw man' because the authorities were unlikely to let him or his captain register a rescue ship. The Eleonore is a pleasure boat. Under the command of Claus-Peter Reisch, she set out again at the end of August 2019 for the sea area off the Libyan coast. The crew was informed about the position of a migrant rubber dinghy by the Alarm-Phone-Initiative and finally took on a total of 104 people from a dinghy. Both Italy and Malta refused requests to enter their ports, so the overcrowded rescue ship had to be supplied with food and water on the high seas. At the beginning of September, after violent thunderstorms, he declared the Eleonore an emergency due to a life-threatening situation on board and ran into the Sicilian port of Pozzallo accompanied by the Italian coast guard, although this was contrary to the instructions of Interior Minister Matteo Salvini, whereupon the Eleonore was confiscated by the Italian police.

In January 2020, Captain Claus-Peter Reisch distanced himself from Mission Lifeline and announced that he would no longer operate any more missions. "Political agitation and radical statements" would not get the rescue at sea any further.

=== Rise Above ===
Because of the confiscation of the two rescue boats after rescue missions, the association eventually sold the Lifeline and acquired a former TF6 Torpedofangboot (torpedo recovery boat) of the German Navy from a private owner. After renovation, it has operated under the name Rise Above for sea rescue in the Mediterranean Sea, and is able to accommodate up to 150 people. It was originally intended to start operating in May 2020. After some delays in preparing the ship, a naming ceremony was expected during April 2021. The vessel began rescue operations in October 2021. Due to rising maintenance costs, Mission Lifeline retired Rise Above at the end of 2023.

=== Lifeline SAR ===
In 2025 the organisation acquired a former German customs vessel dating from 1992; it was rebuilt in 2026 for search and rescue duties in the Mediterranean.

=== Ceuta ===
Starting in August 2026, during the 2026 Ceuta migrant crisis, Mission Lifeline activists provided support for migrants holding out in Ceuta. They claimed to organize food, help with phone charging and finding migrants places to sleep, while being targeted by angry locals, who wanted the migrants to leave.

== Atlantic deployment ==
In 2021, Mission Lifeline began observation and search missions in the Atlantic using the 15m motor yacht Marwa, named for Marwa El-Sherbini near the Canary Islands. The project has worked in conjunction with Searchwing, developing the use of drones for the purpose, and forwards reports of boats in distress to the Spanish sea rescue organization Salvamento Maritimo.

== Ukraine ==
Mission Lifeline has been active in Ukraine since February 25, 2022, the second day after the Russian invasion. During the first six months, the focus was on supporting refugees at the Slovakia–Ukraine border and delivering medicines to several regions of Ukraine, particularly Kyiv, Sumy, Lviv, Ivano-Frankivsk, and Odessa. Thousands were helped by organizing convoys in which private helpers picked up refugees at the border with Slovakia and brought them to Germany and Austria. Mission Lifeline was recommended by SPIEGEL as a contact for those willing to provide support.

Starting in early summer 2022, Mission Lifeline shifted its focus to the Odessa region. The first ambulance was provided in 2022, and funding was raised for the reconstruction of a hospital building in Bashtanka. Various Ukrainian charitable funds were supported with material and, above all, financial assistance (Kyiv, Odessa, Izmail). Starting in early autumn 2022, the focus shifted entirely to the Odessa and Kherson regions. As well as some smaller projects, a local team is implementing the following projects:

- Regular support for internally displaced persons in need in Odessa, especially the elderly and those with disabilities. The project launched in October 2022. Approximately 100 people are supported monthly and supplied with food and hygiene products twice a month.
- The Odessa Center for Internally Displaced Persons (IDPs) is for people evacuated from temporarily occupied territories or dangerous regions such as the Kherson region. The project launched in November 2022. It provides hotel apartments and food for the IDPs.
- Provision of humanitarian aid to villages on the liberated right bank of the Dnieper River. The project began in January 2023. Needs will be coordinated in advance with the relevant local authorities. Deliveries will primarily include hygiene items, food, generators, fuel, and medical supplies. Social centers in the city of Kherson and a maternity hospital will also be supported.
- To support local forces in their efforts to effectively evacuate people in distress and provide first aid treatment, three ambulances have been purchased, fully equipped, and delivered to the Kherson, Poltava, and Odessa regions.

A cooperation with Pharmacists Without Borders has existed since 2022. On behalf of Pharmacists Without Borders, Mission Lifeline carries out medical transports, primarily to the Lviv region. In addition, local NGOs are supported with medical supplies, generators, and much more. A broadcast by MDR featured detailed portraits of the association's work on site.

== Afghanistan ==
Mission Lifeline is one of the organisations who had worked with the Scholz cabinet to bring selected Afghans and families from Pakistan to Germany after the Taliban took control of Afghanistan in 2021. When the next administration stopped the program in December 2025, Pakistan startet to deport some of these Afghans back to Afghanistan. Lifeline activist Jule Klemm told journalists she fears the Taliban may kill those Afghans who had worked for foreign governments if they are forced to return.

== Family reunification ==
In Germany Lifeline activists offer support for unaccompanied minors trying to get family members to be transported to Germany using a Family reunification scheme. In 2026 a 15 year old Syrian boy was reported to be supported by lifeline in order to bring his mother, father and two siblings from Syria to Germany via the scheme. The activists requested an exemption from government restrictions based on hardship.

== Criticism ==
Tweet:

„Ihr seid noch nicht verheiratet? Vielleicht verliebt Ihr Euch zufällig in einen Menschen, der*die hier noch kein Bleiberecht hat. Könnte passieren, oder? Bleibt offen! 💖“

– Mission Lifeline

Due to this tweet from January 23, 2019, translated as

“You are not married yet? Perhaps you happen to fall in love with someone who does not yet have the right to stay here. Could happen, right? Remain open! 💖 "- Mission Lifeline

a text with the title "Sea Rescuers advertise marriages with refugees" appeared in der Bild on January 28, in which claims are made that the association advertises "marriages of convenience" and that the captain Claus-Peter Reisch is on trial in Malta on charges of “smuggling”. State Secretary at the Federal Ministry of the Interior, Stephan Mayer (CSU), also saw the call for marriages of convenience in the tweet. The association stated that the tweet was to be understood as an appeal for donations. Reisch is not on trial in Malta for “smuggling”, but because he is said to have not properly registered the ship. Mission Lifeline took legal action against der Bild because of false claims against their better judgment. On February 12, 2019, der Bild published a reply to this effect.

== Awards ==
- Mission Lifeline and the Lifeline captain Claus-Peter Reisch received the Lew Kopelew Prize on April 7, 2019
- Peace plaque "Swords to Ploughshares" on October 8, 2019
