= Racism in Spain =

Racism in Spain (Spanish: Racismo en España) can be traced back to any historical era, during which social, economic and political conflicts have efficiently been justified by racial differences, be it in the form of racism as an ideology or in the form of racism as simple attitudes or behaviors towards those who are perceived as being different. More common than racism per se are the attitudes linked to xenophobia and nationalism (specially the Spanish, Catalan and Basque ones), as well as religious and/or linguistic-cultural hatred.

== Historical roots ==
=== Limpieza de sangre ===
During the Spanish Inquisition, the descendants of Jews and Muslims were targeted the most. This policy was called Limpieza de sangre (Blood Cleansing). Even after a Jew or a Muslim (Muwallad, an Arab or a Berber) converted to Christianity, the contemporary Spanish authorities referred to them and their descendants as New Christians, and as a result, they were the targets of popular and institutional discrimination and they were also the targets of suspicion by the Spanish Inquisition. New Christians of Muslim heritage were referred to as moriscos, meaning Moor-like. Those of Jewish heritage were termed Conversos and those who secretly continued to practice Judaism were referred to as marranos (either from the Spanish word marrar which means "to err/deviate" or from the Spanish word marrano which means "swine"). After the Reconquista, many Mudéjars (individual Moors, who remained in Iberia after the Christian Reconquista but were not converted to Christianity) remained in Spain as practicing Muslims and Sephardic Jews were required to convert to Catholicism or leave the country in 1492. Attitudes towards Moriscos varied in different regions, but they were never the main targets of the Inquisition. A few decades after the War of the Alpujarras, during which the Muslim-majority population of Granada rebelled, the King of Spain ordered the Expulsion of the Moriscos from Spain, which was successfully implemented in the eastern region of Valencia and was less successfully implemented in the rest of Spain. While Medieval persecutions of Jews and Muslims were aimed at converting or eliminating non-Christians, limpieza de sangre was linked to the ancestry of the new Christians, regardless of their fervor or their lack of it.

=== Enslavement of Africans ===
During the Late Middle Ages and during the Modern era, a small number of Sub-Saharan Africans were captured or bought and sold as slaves. The slaves who were born in Sub-Saharan Africa were called bozales. Their descendants were called Black Ladinos because they had a better command of the Spanish language. During the Spanish colonization of the Americas, the territories which were inhabited by Native Americans were massively depopulated as a result of mass genocide, Old World illnesses and the hardships which were caused by the conquest and the exploitation which followed it. Sub-Saharan African slaves were taken to the Indies as laborers. Initially, they were taken from Spain and later, they were taken from Sub-Saharan Africa. Today, the descendants of these enslaved black people still populate the former Spanish colonies and as a result, they constitute a major community within the African diaspora.

=== Gran Redada ===
The project of «extermination» of the Gitanos, the descendants of Romani people who arrived to Spain in the late Middle Ages, was known as the Gran Redada (Great Roundup). Gypsies lived a nomadic lifestyle and were blamed for crime by the sedentary population. The raid was authorized and organized by the Spanish Monarchy and led to the arrest of most Roma in the region and the genocide of 12,000 Romani people. Although a majority were released after a few months, many spent several years imprisoned and subject to forced labor.

== Spread of scientific racism ==
According to Gonzalo Álvarez Chillida, scientific racism, which was prevalent in Europe during the 19th and 20th centuries, can be considered a doctrine which "affirmed the inherited biological determinism of the moral and intellectual capacities of an individual, and the division of groups of humans into races differentiated by physical traits associated to immutable, inherited moral and intellectual traits" and "affirms the superiority of certain races over others, protected by racial purity and ruined through racial mixing", which "leads to the national right of superior races to impose themselves over the inferior". According to Chillida, such an ideology had difficulties in penetrating Spain due to the concept of "casticismo" which was inverted or ingrained in Spanish society, according to this concept, Spanish castes were considered religious lineages rather than races, in contraposition to the "Moor" and the "Jew". In the Spanish psyche, the Christian-Jewish dichotomy remained predominant over the more modern and racialized aryan-Semite dichotomy, which was developed in Northern Europe.

Eugenic ideas were slow to enter the country; the First Spanish Eugenics Conferences were held in 1928, and the second Spanish Eugenics conferences were held in 1933. Recasens Siches defended racist stances in those conferences. Jurist Quintiliano Saldaña advocated the imposition of a national policy of sterilizations but he received a paltry amount of support in the country.

== Xenophobia among ethnic Spaniards ==
Along with the traditional racism against Jews, Muslims and Romani, Spaniards are known to have extremely xenophobic attitudes among themselves, depending on their region of origin and/or their mother tongue. Over the last 200 years, many Spaniards have nurtured a ferocious hatred for each other, depending on their mother tongue/nationalist identity (Catalan/Valencian, Galician and Basque speakers versus Spanish speakers; Catalan, Valencian, Galician and Basque nationalists versus Spanish nationalists). Nationalist antagonisms among Spaniards reached a climax during the Spanish Civil War and they paralleled the right-wing versus left-wing antagonism. The mass emigration of the Spanish-speaking population from the poorer regions of Spain to Catalonia and the Basque country exacerbated those antagonisms, because many Catalans, Valencians and Basques despised the newcomers because they were poor, a feeling which was exhacerbated by their fear that the Spanish central authorities were attempting to dilute ethnic Catalans, Valencians, Basques and northern Navarrese into the ethnic Spanish majority by using the newcomers as their tools. Nowadays, Spanish media outlets, particularly Spanish right-wing media outlets which are based in Madrid (specially journals like ABC, La Razón, El Mundo, El Español, OKdiario, Periodista Digital, Vozpópuli, Libertad Digital, El Debate or even El País; as well as radio stations like esRadio or Onda Cero; and television channels like Intereconomía or Telemadrid), and Catalan (specially the main regional public television channel TV3, radio stations like Catalunya Radio, and journals like Avui or El Nacional.cat) and Basque nationalist (particularly the main regional public television channel Euskal Irrati Telebista) media outlets which are based in their respective regions, regularly tend to foment confrontations between Spaniards who are from different regions of Spain; these confrontations ultimately coincide with the conflicts of interest which exist between the Spanish central oligarchies which are based in Madrid, and the peripheral Catalan and Basque oligarchies which are based in Barcelona and Bilbao respectively. Most notably and particularly over the last decade, these conflicts have been exacerbated on account of the Catalan independence movement.

== Racism in football ==
In the 1992–93 La Liga season, the late Rayo Vallecano goalkeeper Wilfred Agbonavbare was target of racist abuse from Real Madrid fans, such as chants as ¡Negro, cabrón, recoge el algodón! ("Nigger, motherfucker, go to pick some cotton!") and a middle-aged man from Madrid saying on live TV that "that fucking nigger from Rayo" and the referee Juan Andújar Oliver were to blame for Real Madrid's defeat, much to the amusement of the teenage fans who shouted "Ku Klux Klan". In the same live TV report, a 13-year old Real Madrid fan took furiously the microphone and spat, making a verbal threat to the Nigerian goalkeeper saying "Sunday we'll go to beat to death the nigger, that son of a bitch, in Vallecas". When asked about the abuse suffered, Wilfred stated "That's normal, I am dark-skinned and having made many saves, I expected people to shout at me. But I am a footballer and this is nothing, I am very focused on [playing] my match". The Bukaneros, a far-left ultras group from Rayo Vallecano, dedicated to Wilfred a graffiti with the dedication "For your defense of the Sash against racism, we will not forget you".

Since 1996, after his transfer from Real Madrid to FC Barcelona, many supporter groups of Barcelona's rivals (Ultras Sur being the first) attacked Luis Enrique by chanting "Luis Enrique, tu padre es Amunike" (Luis Enrique, your father is Amunike), which referenced the Nigerian striker, who then, was his teammate for the culés. The abuse still carried on such as in 2016, when a man abused Luis Enrique – now as Barcelona's coach – with said chant when the latter was getting out from the bus at El Prat airport a day before the 2016-17 Champions League fourth group stage match against Manchester City F.C.

Aston Villa's Dalian Atkinson returned from Spain after one season with Real Sociedad, unhappy with the reception he received and identifying racial abuse as a major factor in his rapid departure from the Spanish club.

Ivorian midfielder Félix Dja Ettien suffered racial abuse when he first signed for Levante (where he stayed from 1997 to 2008); he was ignored by the coach due to his inability to speak Spanish and whenever he fell ill, he was accused of having malaria or AIDS.

During a training session in 2004, a Spanish TV crew filmed Spain national team head coach Luis Aragonés trying to motivate José Antonio Reyes by making offensive and racist references to Reyes' then-teammate at Arsenal, Thierry Henry. The phrase used was "Demuestra que eres mejor que ese negro de mierda", translated as "Show that you're better than that fucking black guy". The incident caused uproar in the British media, with calls for Aragonés to be sacked. When Spain played England in a friendly match at the Santiago Bernabéu Stadium soon after, on 17 November 2004, the atmosphere was hostile. Whenever black England players touched the ball, a significant proportion of the Spanish crowd began to make monkey chants, in particular to Shaun Wright-Phillips and Ashley Cole. Additionally, when England sang their national anthem before kick-off, Spanish fans also racially chanted English players. Aragonés' remarks were widely blamed by the British press for inciting the incident. After an investigation into the events during the match, UEFA fined the Royal Spanish Football Federation 100,000 CHF (US$87,000) and warned that any future incidents would be punished more severely. The incident even drew reactions from then-Prime Minister of the United Kingdom Tony Blair and Sports Minister Richard Caborn, with the latter making the claim that the behaviour of Spanish fans was 20 or 30 years behind that of their British counterparts. UEFA noted that possible punishments could include suspension from major international tournaments or the closure of Spain home international matches to supporters. On 7 February 2007, Aragonés won an appeal over the offence, with the misdemeanour being downgraded to "conduct which could be considered to be racist".

In February 2005, Samuel Eto'o received racially driven verbal abuse from some Real Zaragoza spectators during a match for Barcelona. The fans began making monkey-like chants whenever Eto'o had possession of the ball and peanuts were hurled onto the pitch. Eto'o threatened to leave the pitch in the middle of the game, but was prevented by the intervention of his teammates and the referee, who rushed to the pitch to calm him down. His black teammate Ronaldinho, who has suffered similar abuses but less intensely, said he was fed-up with the sounds and that if Eto'o had left the pitch, he would have done the same. As Barcelona won 4–1, Eto'o danced like a monkey, saying rival fans were treating him as a monkey. Referee Fernando Carmona Méndez did not mention the incidents in his match report, commenting only that the behaviour of the crowd was "normal". The fans were identified to police by fellow spectators and they were fined and banned from attending sporting events for five months. Eto'o declared in the aftermath that the punishment was insufficient and that La Romareda, Real Zaragoza's stadium, should have been closed for at least one year. However, Eto'o's coach, Frank Rijkaard, told him to concentrate on football and to stop talking about the incident. Eto'o has stated that he does not take his children to football matches due to the prevalent racism and has also suggested that players walk off if they become victims of racism.

Many other African footballers have also been victims of racial abuse, such as the Cameroonian Carlos Kameni, who was abused while playing for Espanyol against Atlético Madrid, who were fined €6,000.

In January 2009, the Royal Spanish Football Federation fined Real Madrid approximately US$3,900 after a group of fans made fascist gestures and chanted fascist slogans at a match. Match referee Alfonso Pérez Burrull cited "extremist or radical symbolism", and chants making reference to "the gas chamber."

On 27 April 2014, Barcelona player Dani Alves was targeted by Villarreal fans, who threw a banana at him. Alves picked up the banana, peeled it, and took a bite. Teammate and also Brazilian player Neymar's response, to post a photograph of himself on social media also eating a banana, went viral. Other footballers have also since taken photographs of themselves eating bananas. Cyrille Regis, who had been racially abused while a player in the 1970s and '80s, expressed concern that the viral campaign would detract from the important issues of combating racism in the game. Alves said that whoever threw the banana at him should be publicly shamed, and on 30 April 2014, a man was arrested in connection with the incident. Villarreal were later fined €12,000 for the incident.

In early May 2014, Levante's Papakouli Diop complained of receiving racist abuse from opposition Atlético Madrid fans.

Espanyol banned 12 supporters after they were identified as having subjected Atletico Bilbao player Iñaki Williams to racist abuse in a match in January 2020.

On 4 April 2021, the players of Valencia left the pitch during a La Liga game against Cádiz after their player, Mouctar Diakhaby, was allegedly subjected to racist abuse.

In September 2022, Real Madrid player Vinicius Jr was criticised on television for dancing whilst celebrating a goal; the player said that criticism, which compared him to a "monkey", was racist. Following this, some fans of Atletico Madrid were accused of singing racist songs about Vinicius, which was condemned by La Liga. Vinicius Jr later said that La Liga did not do anything about racists, a few days after which La Liga announced that they had filed charges against those accused. In February 2023 it was revealed that nobody in Spain "has been sentenced or punished for a racist incident related to football". In June 2024, a court in Spain sentenced three men to eight months in prison for racist chants at Real Madrid's game against Valencia in May 2023. This is the first ever conviction for racist gestures in football in Spain.

In October 2024, fans of the Real Madrid made racist comments in El Clásico to FC Barcelona's players Lamine Yamal and Alejandro Balde.

== Racial profiling ==
Racial profiling by police forces in Spain is a common practice. A study by the University of Valencia, found that people of color are up to ten times more likely to be stopped by the police on the street. Amnesty International accused Spanish authorities of using racial and ethnic profiling, with police singling out people who are not white in the street and public places.

In 2011, the United Nations Committee on the Elimination of Racial Discrimination (CERD) urged the Spanish government to take "effective measures" to ethnic profiling, including the modification of existing laws and regulations which permit its practice. In 2013, the UN Special Rapporteur, Mutuma Ruteere, described the practice of ethnic profiling by Spanish law enforcement officers "a persisting and pervasive problem". In 2014, the Spanish government approved a law which prohibited racial profiling by police forces.

== See also ==
- Antisemitism in Spain
- Basque conflict
- Catalan independence movement
- Environmental racism in Spain
- History of the Jews in Spain
- History of Spain
- Human rights in Spain
- Islam in Spain
- Sabino Arana
- Spanish nationalism
- Valentí Almirall i Llozer
- Valladolid debate
