= Environmental racism in Western Europe =

Environmental racism is a form of institutional racism leading to landfills, incinerators, and hazardous waste disposal being disproportionally placed in communities of colour. This includes the lack of minority and indigenous representation in environmental decision-making and inequality in resource development. Internationally, it is also associated with extractivism, which places the environmental burdens of mining, oil extraction, and industrial agriculture upon Indigenous peoples and poorer nations largely inhabited by people of colour.

Environmental racism in Western Europe is well documented. Minority groups such as Romani people are subjected to disproportionate exposure to environmental hazards, denial of access to clean air, water, and natural resources, and infringement of environmentally related human rights. In Northern Europe, indigenous groups such as the Sami face a history of environmental racism across the Sápmi region in Norway, Sweden, Finland, and Russia. This continues today largely in the form of resource development that disproportionally impacts indigenous lands and livelihoods.

== Germany ==
The systematic targeting and genocide of Romani and Sinti communities in Germany during the Holocaust was not officially recognized until 1982. Despite having a recorded presence in German-speaking territories since 1419, many Romani and Sinti were denied or stripped of citizenship following the second world war. In absence of comprehensive reparation or conciliation processes, Romani and Sinti in Germany have experienced ongoing violence, harassment, and marginalization within a broader context of environmental discrimination. The relationship between postwar socio-economic exclusion of Romani and Sinti communities with environmental marginalization has been documented by scholars such as Alphia Abdikeeva as early as 2002. According to Abdikeeva, Heuss, and Kawczyński, "most of the so-called 'Sinti settlements' were formed after the war, when German Sinti and Roma who returned to their hometowns from concentration camps were resettled in city and town slums, usually in the least attractive area, in conditions which posed serious environmental and health risks".

=== Heidelberg: Sinti settlement in Henkel-Teroson-Street ===
As of 2004, several hundred Sinti families resided on the outskirts of Heidelberg in a settlement in Henkel-Teroson-Street. Most residents were unemployed; both the land and groundwater were believed to be contaminated. Across the street from the site is a chemical plant operated by Henkel Chemical Company. In spite of health concerns, as of 2004 no studies on health and environmental effects had been conducted. The plot is owned by Heidelberg city and now holds "Notwohnungen" (emergency housing) and refugee accommodations constructed in 2006. An environmental impact assessment for a planned neighbouring big-box store did not assess groundwater contamination in 2021.

=== Berlin Land Dreilinden property (Sinti camp) ===
Since 1995, authorities in Berlin have operated a user-fee camping facility for seasonal Sinti workers on the Dreilinden property. The facility houses up to 200 persons and is a source of concern due to its location on the outskirts of Berlin, on a part of former Checkpoint Bravo. Housing conditions are poor, while utilities and infrastructure is minimal.

=== Hamburg: Georgswerder Ring Sinti settlement ===
In the mid-1980s, authorities selected an area next to a former toxic waste dump as the location for a new Sinti settlement by the name of Georgswerder Ring on the outskirts of Hamburg, in spite of the site having been deemed unfit for human habitation during the mid-1970s. Home to at least 200 persons, residents were not informed of the site's history. As of 2004, there were concerns that rising groundwater may have forced toxins to the surface and contaminated the land and air, sparking fears among some medical experts that birth defects, stillborns, and certain illnesses could be dramatically on the rise. As of 2004, the settlement was isolated, poorly served by public transportation, and located in close proximity to the new Hamburg city dump posing further ongoing health concerns.

=== Kistnersgrund Sinti settlement ===
In the 1970s, the Kistnersgrund Sinti settlement was constructed in Bad Hersfeld, Hesse. Located on the outskirts of the city, it was situated on top of a garbage dump. Following a hepatitis outbreak in the early 1980s, authorities relocated the community to a new settlement called Haunewiese, where residents have experienced substandard housing conditions.

== United Kingdom ==
Air pollution in the United Kingdom has been identified as an issue disproportionately affecting minority ethnic and racial groups, particularly those who identify as Black-British. According to a British government report, "Nationally, for those who live in areas overlapping the motorway and A road network in England, on average ethnic groups not classified as White–British are exposed to 17.5 per cent higher concentrations of PM10 ... Across the different areas individuals identified as Black or Black-British African are exposed to the highest levels of PM10 of up to almost 30 per cent higher than White British.

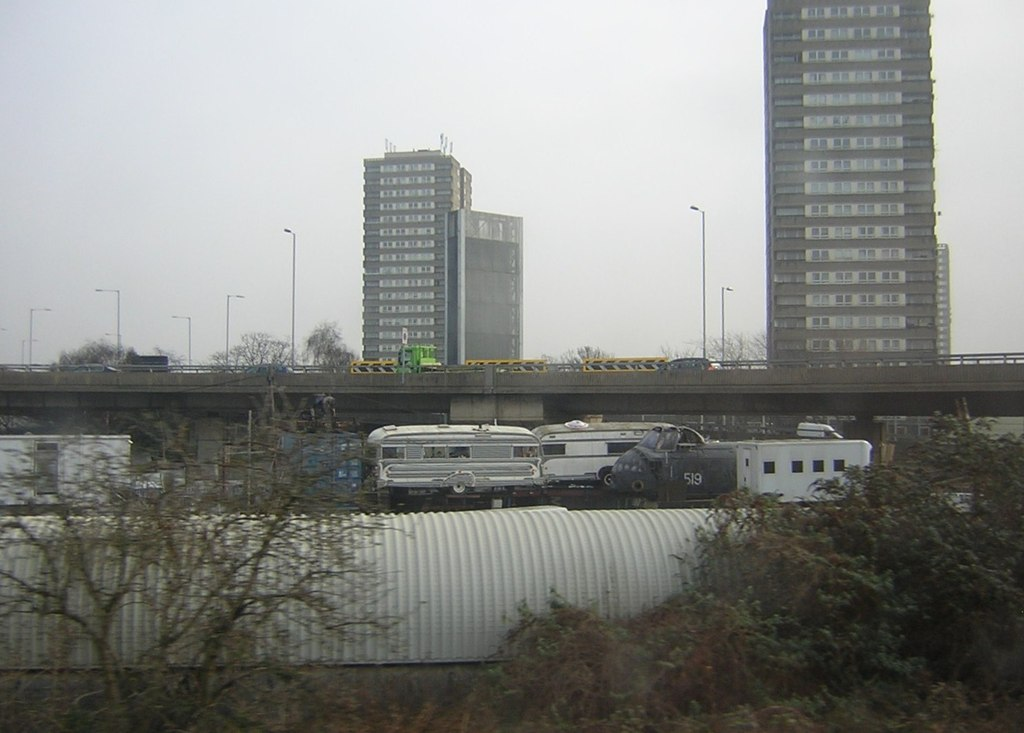
Traveller halting site, London.

Romani and Travellers in the UK have been identified as experiencing unequal burdens of negative environmental living conditions. In Wales, Romani and Traveller sites have been documented as being frequently located near scrap metal facilities, which is a major source of employment. Romani and Travellers frequently burn scrap as a way of cleaning metals for recycling which can be a cause for health concerns. Throughout the United Kingdom, many public Romani and Traveller encampment and housing sites are, according to Staniewicz, "located in polluted environments, far away from local services, next to sewage works or under flyovers. Pitches are often overcrowded and facilities are well below the standard expected of social housing."

In general, Romani and Traveller sites are rural and segregated from areas that would normally be considered residential areas; it is common for these sites to be environmentally disadvantaged by being located near motorways, railroads, and garbage dumps, quarries, waterways, electrical transmission lines, or surrounded by industrial zones, all of which have been identified as environmental health concerns. As of 2004, seventy percent of local authority (LA) Irish Traveller sites in England were identified as having at least two or more environmental hazards, while twenty-three percent of such sites were identified as being subject to four or more environmental hazards.

According to Steger, "A high percentage of Gypsy and Traveller communities in the United Kingdom (UK) are located in areas that are fully unsuitable for living and raising families. In addition to the environmental health risks posed by living in highly polluted areas, such communities also tend to be on the outskirts of towns making access to public services, transportation, and employment difficult, if not impossible." The United Kingdom Department of Health supported a 2004 study that identified Romani and Travellers as being subject to disproportionate health needs compared to other ethnic minority groups in the UK, yet receiving substantially less health services.

=== Barry's Council's Gander site ===
One location of particular concern has been Barry's Council's Gander site in West London, inhabited by Irish Travellers. As of 2004, the site was situated near a highway and next to an aggregate concrete factory, which was built in 1999, prior to the Travellers being moved onto the site by local authorities. One survey determined that approximately half the residents felt that the site was unhealthy; since moving to the site, residents have reported skin rashes and abnormalities, asthma, and breathing difficulties among infants. One observer has stated

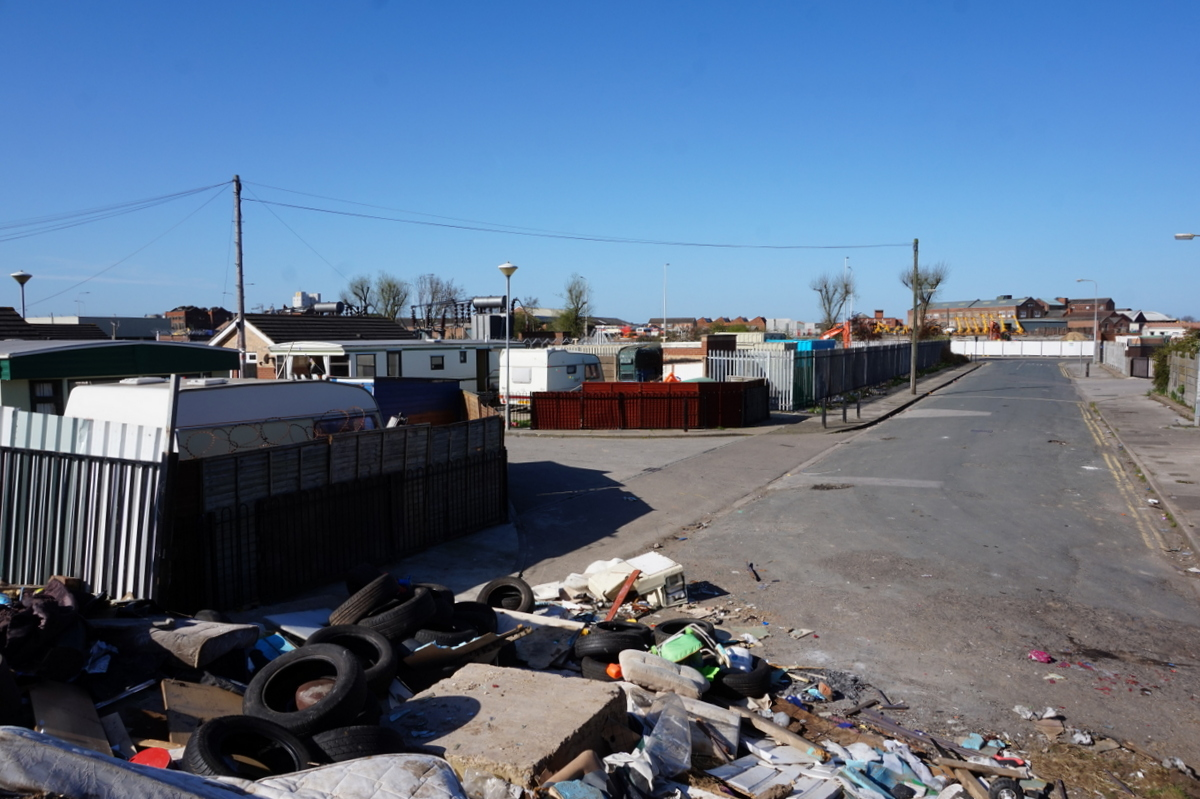
Illegal waste disposal at Traveller site, Hull.

Maybe the asthma has a connection with the factory because you couldn't even see through the windscreen [on her car] with the dust on it. The general health of the Travellers on site is pretty good ... a lot of them are registered with the medical centre.

Communication between factory management and Traveller residents over health concerns and industrial operations plans has been described as being insufficient. The settlement was subject to irregular or nonexistent garbage collection services, poor sewerage, rat infestations, and fire hazards. Residents asked for either the factory to be shut down, or for themselves to be relocated to a different area of Gander. At one meeting at the site in 2001, residents expressed a readiness to leave their traditional nomadic lifestyle by moving into houses, citing restrictive laws on travelling, frequent evictions, allegations of constant police harassment, and deteriorating health conditions at the Barry site. Dr. Colm Powers, who conducted a comprehensive report in 2004 on the social and health situation of Irish Travellers in England, has argued that pressure on Travellers to abandon their nomadic lifestyle constitutes a pressing human rights issue. According to Powers, the pressure to settle is twofold, stemming from the perceived criminalization of travelling, combined with the arguably poor quality of camping locations. Powers argues the process of settling into permanent housing is a traumatic experience for many Travellers, who can experience cultural challenges and further social marginalization. In the view of Powers,

These twin pressures [of criminalization and poor camping sites] gives support to the painful and disturbing process of cultural breakdown that leads to assimilation into the most marginalised and excluded sections of society. Nomadism is usually recognised by settled society as the sole (or salient) ethnic qualifier for Travellers, so its criminalisation and eradication erroneously signals the cultural assimilation of Travellers and Gypsies. This 'blindness' to the depth, complexity and strength of Traveller culture leaves 'settled' Travellers with little sensitive health and welfare support when they are forced into settled accommodation and it is most needed. The inability or unwillingness of many institutional support agencies to engage actively, supportively and sensitively with settled Travellers is creating a well of discontent among many young settled Travellers that is already evident in the high levels of criminalisation particularly in the settled Irish Traveller population

=== Discrimination towards Romani and Travellers in Green Belt lands ===
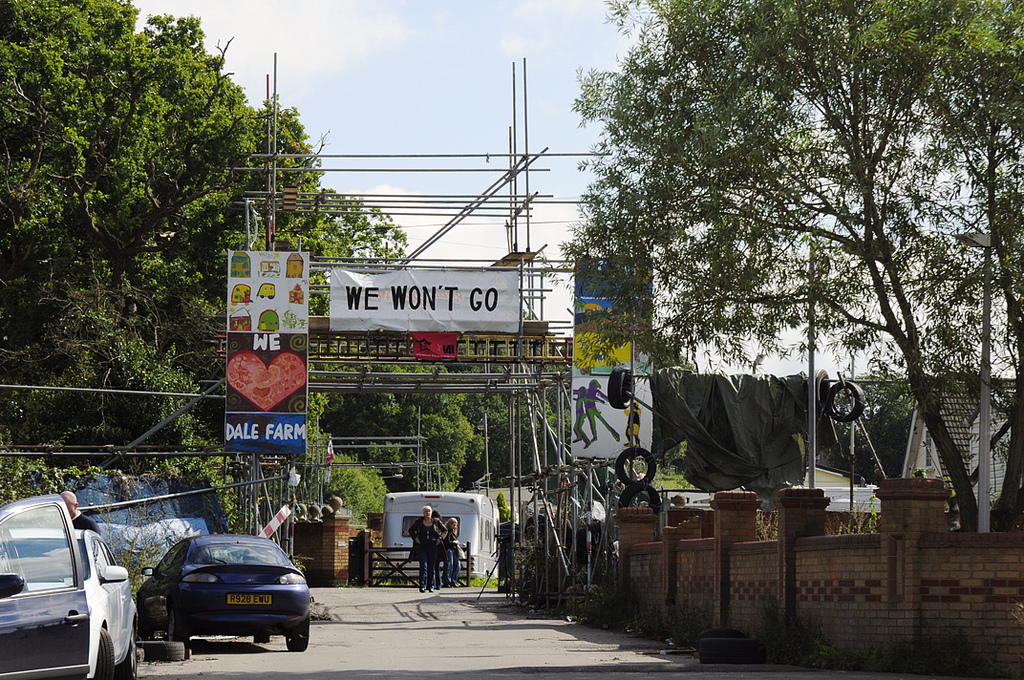
Dale Farm, prior to eviction

In 2015, community secretary Eric Pickles was found by a high court ruling to be in breach of the Equality Act 2010. According to Justice Gilbart, sitting in London, Pickles had "unlawfully discriminated" against Romani communities seeking to establish camping sites in Green Belt lands by systematically delaying and overturning their development proposals. According to Romani activists, "local councils have consistently failed to earmark land for potential sites in local plans, and many Gypsies and Travellers have bought land, including in the green belt, to develop sites for themselves". Yet, according to Justice Gilbart, Pickles had created a policy in 2013–2014 that systematically turned down development appeal requests by "Romani Gypsies" and "Travellers". This policy was found by Justice Gilbart to be a protocol "which discriminated against a racial group".

The planning minister, Brandon Lewis, responded to the ruling by stating "The government's planning policy is clear that both temporary and permanent traveller sites are inappropriate development in the green belt. Today's judgment does not question that principle."

The Equality and Human Rights Commission responded to the ruling by stating "We have a duty to protect everyone from discrimination and ensure that the law is applied fairly, consistently and equally for all. We understand the need to be sensitive about green belt development but this should not be used to single out individuals for unlawful discrimination. Planning decisions should be taken on the merits of an application, not the characteristics of the applicant."

Previously, Eric Pickles, a Conservative cabinet minister, had been accused in 2011 of allowing his department to release a statement which referred to Traveller camps on green belt lands as a "blight". During an interview on ITV, Pickles stated of the camps that "We inherited a situation where the number of illegal sites had gone up four-fold and what we expect them to do is obey the law like you and I do," he said, continuing "It does not give people the right to come on to a green belt...and to trash it." Joseph P. Jones, chairman of the Gypsy Council and Yvonne MacNamara, director of the Irish Traveller's Movement respectively, have responded with public statements expressing their view that Pickles' comments were discriminatory and hostile in nature, with Jones stating that Pickles' statements constituted an example of how the Romani and Traveller communities are often treated by dominant culture as "toxic waste". According to Jones, the UK government had been applying a discriminatory standard by denying Romani and Traveller development applications, while simultaneously having a history of approving construction of towns such as Milton Keynes, Basildon New Town, and New Ash Green, the latter two of which were, in the words of Jones, "built for the total strangers of the London overflow, on the open countryside or green belt". In the opinion of Jones,

We [Romani and Travellers] have been constantly pushed out on the periphery of society, through the failures those in local political positions to identify and provide accommodation. This is not new, ever since the Caravans Sites Act of 1960 the Gypsy/Traveller population have constantly seen the goal posts moved, heard those in power, saying this is not the right place for your type. But we never seem to get any directions to a place that is.

==== Dale Farm Romani and Traveller settlement ====
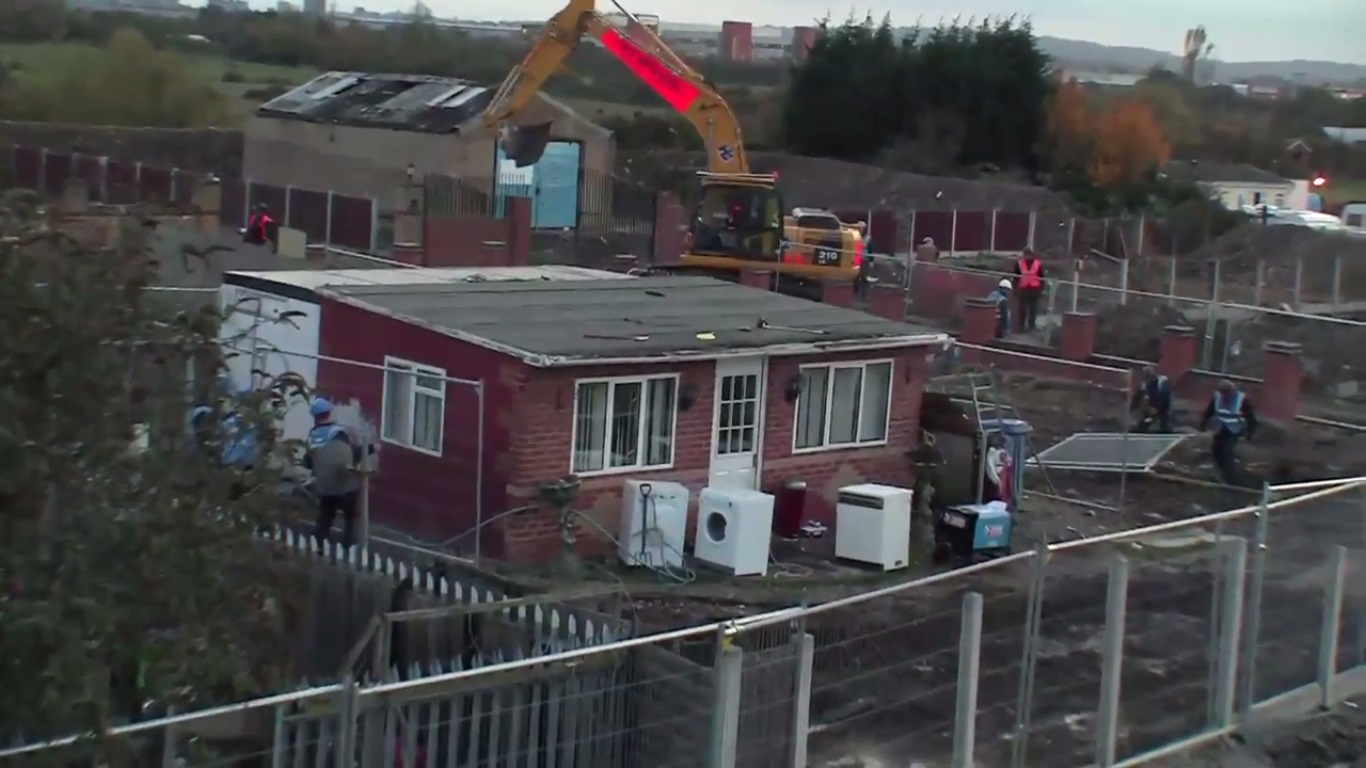
Demolition of house, Dale Farm 2011.

The eviction of Dale Farm in Essex, a camp settlement formerly home to approximately 1,000 Romani and Travellers on Green Belt land has been highlighted as a case of racially motivated marginalization. The camp, located on a former scrap metal yard, had been inhabited by Romani and Travellers since the 1960s; however, despite ownership of the land, residents were denied zoning permits to develop the property. Illuzzi argues that in 2011, "expulsions and legal battle over the status of Dale Farm in the UK highlighted yet another confrontation over the illegality of Roma/Traveller behavior when they legally purchased 'green belt' land and were denied permits from the town council to build on that land. Town councils continue to work against allowing Traveller settlements in or near their towns." The evictions were completed in 2011 and involved violent clashes with police.

=== Historical documentation (Mitcham Common) ===
Instances of ethnic marginalization within an environmental context have been documented in the United Kingdom dating back to the late 1800s. According to Mayall, the district of Mitcham was subject to spatial segregation of transient populations, including Romani and Traveller groups (referred to as "Gypsies"):

As we have noted, certain locales appear to lend themselves to housing a transient population: Mitcham on the borders of South London and Surrey was one such place. By the late 19th century Surrey was a main centre for Gypsies, itinerants and vagrants with an estimated (though probably exaggerated) 10,000 in the county alone, many of whom had been expelled from London through a combination of 'the Metropolitan Police, land agents, sanitary authorities, and building developments.' (Mayall, 1988, pp 158-9).

Smith and Greenfields note the link between poverty, upper-class departure (for the United States context, see white flight) and the demographic presence of Romani and Traveller communities in Mitcham, as well as the economic prominence of environmentally polluting 'dirty industries' within the community. In the words of Smith and Greenfields,

W.J. Bush & Co distillery explosion aftermath.

Mitcham had long been one of the poorest parishes in Surrey and records of Gypsies camping in the area date back to the 1700s. Between the mid-19th and early 20th centuries the area declined in respectability as several landowning families departed and its population grew significantly as outward migration from London increased the population of poor and displaced residents (Smith, 2005, p 67). Of these, Gypsies and itinerants formed a significant minority: the 1881 census records 230 Gypsies and vagrants camping on Mitcham Common ... [Mitcham] contained an abundance of market gardens which provided regular seasonal employment with the locality becoming an important site for industry in the early to mid-20th century, particularly the 'dirty industries' such as paint making, chemical works and bone boiling, which had been expelled from inner London by the 1845 Health Act. The importance of Gypsy labour to the area's industry in this period is revealed by Montague, who notes that ... when Purdom's [paint and varnish] factory was originally established production had been seasonal, taking place mainly in the winter months when Gypsy and other casual labour employed on the physic gardens during the rest of the year was available at very low rates. (Montague, 2006, p 79)

By 1909, over 190 vans were documented as being situated at Mitcham Common, along with numerous others at sites nearby, in spite of efforts to displace nomadic residents through by-laws such as the Metropolitan Commons (Mitcham) Supplemental Act 1891 (54 & 55 Vict. c. xxvi). In the words of Smith and Greenfields, the urban area of Mitcham became a district where

Gypsies had moved into the small terraced houses that were known locally as 'Redskin Village' (in reference to the dark colouring of its inhabitants) by the 1920s. According to Montague, by the 1930s the area had become one of the most disreputable and notorious in the district and was 'associated in the public mind with some of the worst slums in the emerging township' (Montague, 2006, p 113).

At 7am on March 30, 1933, an explosion took place at the W.J. Bush & Co essential oils distillery adjacent to 'Redskin Village', killing a twelve-year-old boy and seriously injuring twenty-three others. According to the Merton Memories Photographic Archive, "the explosion brought this community ['Redskin Village'] to an end", although the distillery re-opened and continued operations until 1968, closing after 200 years in the same location. Images taken of the explosion provide early photographic documentation of an event involving an ethnic minority community in the UK affected by an industrial disaster.

== Ireland ==
Travellers in Ireland have a documented history of experiencing racism within an environmental context, particularly with regards to hazardous working conditions in the metal recycling sector. According to research conducted in 2010 by the All Ireland Traveller Health Study, approximately 2,700 Irish Travellers lacked access to running water, out of a total Traveller population of 36,224 in the Republic of Ireland and 3,905 in Northern Ireland. In the same survey, nearly a quarter of Traveller respondents stated that they felt either "unhealthy or very unhealthy" in their places of residence.

According to a 2008 report on Traveller housing conditions by the Centre for Housing Research, 82.5% of housing locations (namely group housing facilities and caravan or halting sites) were found to be situated with "some form of environmental hazard nearby". Out of 40 halting sites and group housing facilities evaluated, 33 were found to be near such hazards, which were listed as electricity pylons, telephone masts, dumps, major roads, and industrial pollution. Likewise, sixteen of the locations had no designated green space (and of the remaining 19 sites, only five had green space in active use), thirty-one had no functional emergency equipment, thirty-eight had no communal phone access, and twenty-one did not have provisions for horses.

As a distinct ethnic group, Travellers in Ireland are subject to racism, in spite of their physical appearances. According to Canadian sociologist Jane Helleiner, "some of the first challenges to a model of Southern Ireland as ethnically homogeneous and free of racism came from activists concerned with the status of Travelling People ... The identification of Travellers as an ethnic group has been a central premise of the human rights and community development work of Traveller advocacy organizations from at least the 1980s, and these groups by naming the discrimination and exclusion experiences by Travellers as a form of Irish racism have been influential in injecting the term into Irish political discourse (McVeigh 1996: 9)." According to Helleiner, "For some activist-scholars ... anti-Travellerism is understood as a form of 'racism without race'—i.e., a form of inferiorized difference that does not invoke biological inferiority, but rather notions of undesirable cultural difference (see Anthias citing Balibar 1995: 294)."

=== Galway city dump ===
During the early 1980s, Galway City began to experience significant economic growth. According to Helleiner (2000), "In the early 1950s the central government prompted internationally financed industrial development in the Galway region, and by the mid-1960s the city was specifically targeted for investment and provided with industrial estate (Ó Cearbhill and Cawley 1984: 258-9) ... Galway City has continued to see tremendous economic, demographic, and spatial growth associated with international investment in industry and service sectors and a vigorous tourist trade." However, according to Helleiner, social and economic inequalities have persisted in the region.

Travellers continue to engage in informal and self-employed labour, particularly metal recycling and car scrapping, as this type of employment supports "an independent and nomadic way of life". During the 1980s Travellers increasingly gravitated toward casual labour that allowed for greater autonomy than formal labour, motivated in part by the racist conditions of formal labour markets in Ireland. For employment, Travellers scavenged from the Galway city dump as well as industrial and commercial refuse bins for scrap metal. Work in the scrap metal trade at the Galway City dump has been described by Helleiner as being exclusively performed by women, working in unsanitary conditions amidst piles of garbage. In the words of Helleiner, "None of the men engaged in this dangerous activity.

The work at the dump was organized by informal means, as described by Helleiner: "Gaining and keeping a regular position at the dump depended on having close kinship or affinal ties to those already established." Also, scrap metal collection involved logistical challenges of transporting product, and the need for capital investments such as vehicles. In spite of the health risks (including cleaning the metal by burning off non-metallic material) and capital investments entailed in this work, Travellers were economically disadvantaged by fluctuations in prices set from scrap metal merchants. According to Helleiner

Travellers were in a vulnerable position in this exchange as the prices for scrap were set by larger forces of demand and supply and bore no relationship to the amount of labour involved. There were few ways for Travellers to alter the terms of trade to their advantage. Most, for instance, had little withholding power as they lacked sufficient space on which to stockpile scrap in anticipation of higher prices ... This particular form of 'self-employment,' then, was dependent upon unequal exchanges over which Travellers had little independent control.

=== Carrickmines fire ===
At 4:24 AM, October 10, 2015, Dublin emergency services responded to a fire that swept through a trailer at the Carrickmines halting site on Glenamuck Road South. Ten Travellers, five children and five adults, perished in the blaze. Fourteen were left homeless. Substandard housing conditions have been cited as potential contributing causes of the fire. Immediate attempts by survivors to stop the blaze were impossible due to the water at the closest fire hydrant having been shut off by local authorities several months prior. Following the tragedy, plans were made to rehouse the survivors at a site adjacent to Rockville Drive. At first, survivors of the fire received public shows of respect. However, claiming not to have been consulted by their local council, residents of the neighbourhood opposed the resettlement, and protested by blockading excavation machinery from the site. According to a close non-Traveller family friend of the survivors who organized the funeral,

From Dublin to Wexford, the courtesy from people was just absolutely, it was like a state funeral. Every village that we passed through, people come out, they raised their cups, you know, it was so much respect shown for the family all the way down and, you know, it wasn't ignored, the family couldn't believe that people actually come out and respected them in this manner, but that was all taken away the minute we hit Wexford town because it was in lockdown even down to the local car parks, for the first time in my life, I got an insight on what it was like to be a Traveller.

The Irish Minister for Equality Aodhán Ó Ríordáin responded to the protest by tweeting, "This disgusting behaviour is not reflective of all settled people." The Minister for the Environment, Alan Kelly, also commented on the incident, condemning the protest as "wrong". The survivors were not resettled at the Rockville Drive site. Instead, the survivors were re-housed at an isolated location adjacent to a decommissioned garbage dump in immediate proximity to a high voltage power station, described by actor and Irish traveller John Connors as a place "that no one could object to".

In August 2017, the survivors returned to their former living site, and were reportedly pleased with the halting site-style redevelopment carried out by the Dún Laoghaire-Rathdown County Council, according to a family friend. As of August 2017, inquests into the fire deaths are currently underway, and survivors have called for a full inquiry into the tragedy.

== France ==
=== Immigrant populations and proximity to hazardous waste facilities ===
In France, categories of minority and race are not officially recognized, nor are they recorded in census or socio-demographic data, which can make instances of environmental racism difficult to identify. Only nationality and country of birth are recorded, and only for first-generation migrants; persons born abroad in France are mostly from North and Sub-Saharan Africa, as well as a smaller presence from Eastern Europe.

According to a 2008 study by Lucie Laurian titled Environmental Injustice in France, "towns with high proportions of immigrants tend to host more hazardous sites, even controlling for population size, income, [and] degree of industrialization of the town and region". In the case of towns which have the highest percentage of residents who are born abroad, there is a significantly higher likelihood for there to be polluted sites nearby. As stated by Laurian,

The quarter of towns with the highest proportion of persons born abroad (more than 6.3%) are, for example, three times more likely to have illegal dumps, five times more likely to have Seveso ["sites where dangerous, toxic or flammable materials are stored permanently or temporarily"] and seven times more likely to have Basol ["sites where (1) soil and/or groundwater are either known to be polluted or potentially polluted; (2) pose or can pose risks to persons or the environment; and (3) are the object of public intervention"] sites than the quarter of towns with the lowest proportion of persons born abroad (less than 1.8%).

=== Environmental segregation of Romani and Yenish Traveller sites ===
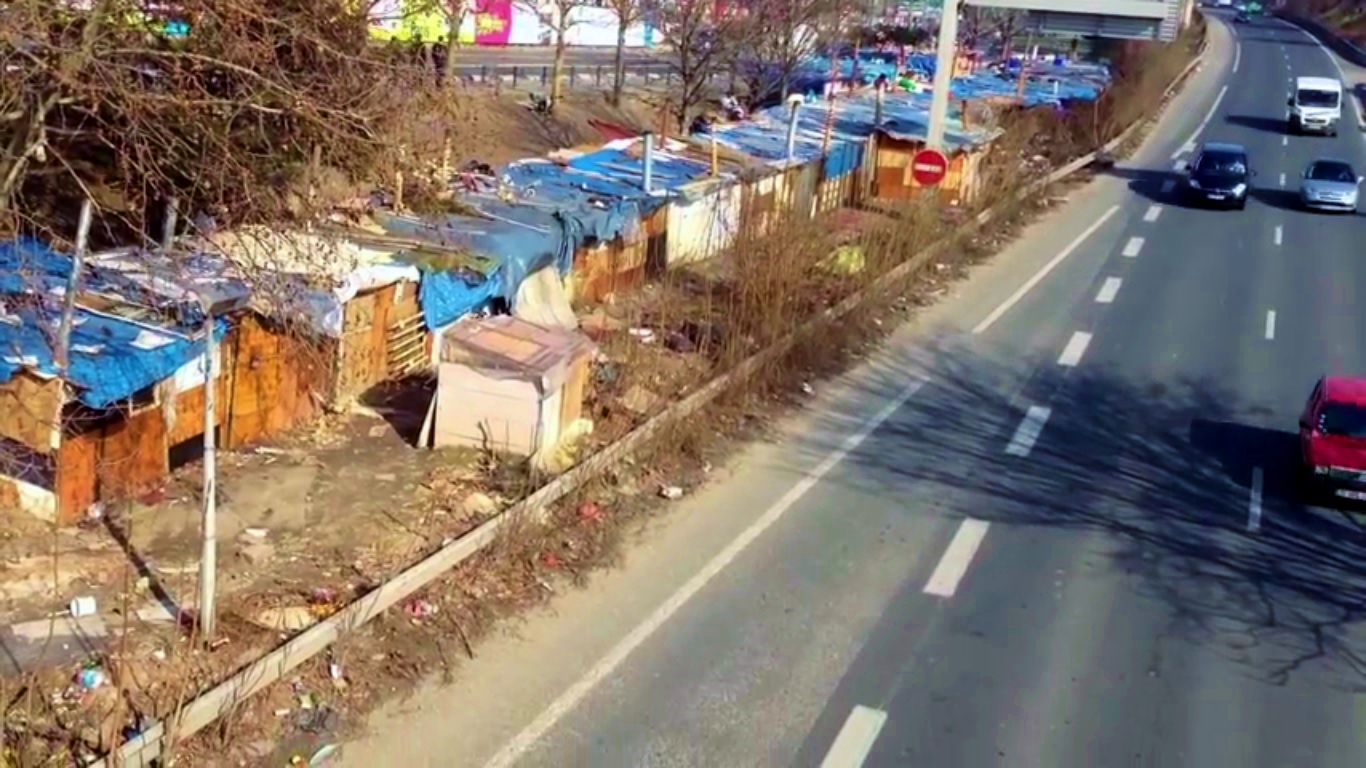
Romani shantytown in St-Denis, near Paris.

As of 2008, there were 279 halting sites designated for French Travellers (Yenish), a distinct ethnic group in France. In a RAXEN interview with the National Association of Catholic Travellers, environmental issues were cited as a factor in the segregated conditions found at most Traveller halting sites, which one resident likened to "Indian Reservations". According to the Association,

Nine times out of ten, these sites are out of town, near rubbish dumps; they are places of 'social relegation'. The association has managed to have certain sites banned that were situated in 'Seveso zones', between motorways and a refinery, seven km from a school etc."

Similar issues exist for Romani communities in France. Most reside in shantytowns and other forms of substandard housing, frequently located far outside city centers without access to social services, health care, utilities, or clean drinking water. These settlements are often situated on brownfield sites, near highways or other industrialized transportation infrastructure, or squatting on agricultural or forest lands.

=== Romani settlements and e-waste ===
There is evidence to suggest that Romani communities in France may be experiencing environmental discrimination through exposure to e-waste contamination. According to a 2010 investigative report by The Ecologist written by Carolyn Lebel, some Romani people in France have been compelled by "poverty and discrimination" to become involved with the scavenging of electronic waste (e-waste), handling an unknown quantity of the 750,000 tonnes of French e-waste that annually disappears into informal disposal and recycling networks.

Due to allegedly discriminatory employment regulations in France, many Romani find it impossible to gain formal employment. As a result, many have turned to clandestine recycling operations of e-waste in slums outside large French cities. At these sites, e-waste is broken into various types of metals, such as aluminum, copper, iron, and lead. Copper is extracted from cables by burning them in open fires, while car batteries are melted down for lead and refrigerators are sent through car crushers without removing cooling agents, which can release up to four tonnes of greenhouse gases into the atmosphere per unit.

According to the observations of Dr. Bernard Moriau, "[The Romani] would work directly above these clouds of black smoke", in reference to Romani people he witnessed working in a forest in the Val d'Oise region near Paris. In 2008, contamination from cancer-causing heavy metals was found in an evicted Romani camp near Lyon; likewise, this finding was preceded by a 1998 study in Bordeaux, Annecy, and Toulouse. The study, conducted by Doctors of the World and local NGOs, identified abnormal lead exposure in fifty percent of children at the camps. Furthermore, one-quarter of the children examined were identified as having lead poisoning. In a 2010 case, 19 children at a site in Lyon were found to have high blood lead levels.

According to Dr. Jean-Claude Guiraud, thousands of children in France living at or near illegal recycling sites are at risk of lead exposure, which, according to Guiraud "can cause permanent damage to all the organs including the brain". In spite of these statistics, the issue, as of 2010, has received little attention from authorities in France.

=== Illegal mushroom harvesting ===
Since 2004, there has been criticism of Romanian and Bulgarian EU citizens who allegedly out-compete French locals in the wild mushroom picking industry. Eastern European harvesters, a large number of whom are believed to be ethnic Romani, have removed significant quantities of porcini and milk cap (Lactarius deliciosus) mushrooms for export to Spain, allegedly emptying forests of mushroom supplies. These predominantly Romani pickers have been accused of harvesting improperly, allegedly causing permanent damage to the forest ecosystem and destroying future mushroom yields.

According to Thomas Kuyper, "professor of fungal ecology and diversity at Wageningen University in the Netherlands", there is no scientific evidence of improper harvesting methods causing damage to future mushroom yields. Kuyper suggests that the allegations were a result of xenophobia rather than evidence-based observations, and that there is a history of similar accusations in Germany and the Netherlands in response to migrant harvesters. In Slovakia in 2006, accusations were published claiming that Romani mushroom harvesters in the Tatra region were responsible for an alleged lack of forage for bears.

Large numbers of predominantly Romani workers have been reportedly harvesting without proper licenses (although no documentation exists as to the exact number of whom are ethnic Romani). According to Jean Louis Traversier of the French Forest Service, an estimated 80 percent of 2013 mushroom harvests in the southeastern Drôme and Ardèche regions were both legally and illegally picked by Bulgarian and Romanian nationals who had crossed into the region from Spain.

Quality control concerns have been raised by vendors about the traceability of supplies, with fears that unregulated sourcing may pose a health risk for consumers of the mushrooms. According to facts provided by Traversier, a legal harvest in 2004-2005 involving a Spanish company was followed in later years by unauthorized picking. In the words of journalist Alissa J. Rubin, in 2013

about a thousand workers from Romania and Bulgaria came into the region by night in minivans or small trucks stacked high with empty boxes ... they parked on narrow local roads and slipped into the forests or hiked to the high plateaus and camped for as long as three weeks, building makeshift campsites and rising in the damp, chilly mornings to hunt for wild mushrooms. They hid their haul in the woods, and trucks came by each evening to pick them up.

While supplying a high-priced culinary delicacy, wages for illegal mushroom harvesters are extremely low. In describing the issue of illegal harvesting, Traversier expressed concern for the well-being of the pickers, stating that he felt many of the Romani harvesters were "picking to survive".

=== Water access ===
According to Szilvasi and Zaharieva, a majority of the 17,929 persons in 2015 who were recorded living in unauthorized camps (which are associated with Romani and Traveller residence) throughout France do not have reliable access to clean water. As of 2016, in Paris there were 21 Romani encampments with a documented lack or absence of water and sanitation services.

=== Besançon ===
According to an ERRC report, the management of a French Traveller (gens du voyage) halting site in Besançon was documented raising water rates above regular prices, which is illegal under French law. This instance is part of a larger issue with equality in water access at Traveller halting sites, where there have been reports of water access being cut off for persons who miss a payment, a practice which has been illegal under French law since 2015.

== Portugal ==
At least 6400 Romani persons in Portugal are estimated to not have access to reliable, formal access to clean drinking water. Due to the non-participation of some municipalities in the UNECE survey that calculated this statistic, the actual number is unknown and believed to be higher.

According to research in 2011 by Lydia Gall, a lawyer for the European Roma Rights Centre, Romani in Portugal are subject to an "appalling" housing situation without access to roads or drinking water. In many cases, Romani communities are located in geographically segregated locations, such as behind hills and on the outskirts of cities without access to transportation; in some cases, segregation has been further entrenched by the construction of walls to separate Romani settlements from surrounding neighbourhoods. Several cases of environmental injustice have been identified, such as in Bragança, Rio Maior, Beja, and Vidigueira.

In Bragança, in the far north of the country, Gall has described how "a community was kicked out of its camp by the authorities, who told them they could live in the garbage dump".

In Rio Maior, 85 kilometres north of Lisbon, Gall has described a scenario in which "14 gypsy [Romani] families were placed in precarious wooden houses, on top of a hazardous coal mine and separated from the rest of the population by a dense forest".

According to Gall, one "extreme" case of discrimination can be found in Beja, 180 kilometres south of Lisbon, where Romani are settled in social housing constructed "with a separation wall, far from the urban centre and near a dog pound, whose sewage containing animal excrement runs through the housing project, with obvious consequences for the health of the inhabitants".

In Vidigueira, 160 kilometres south of Lisbon, a Romani settlement had its sole source of potable water shut off by the police.

By 2013, an estimated 500 persons of predominantly African immigrant and Romani origin were residing in the Terras do Lelo (Terras da Costa) shantytown in Lisbon, with no access to sewerage, clean drinking water, or legal electricity. In 2008, the slum residents had been scheduled for relocation to new homes with better living conditions, however plans were put on hold as a result of the Portuguese financial crisis. In the words of Miguel Bemba da Silva, a resident of Zaïrean origin who worked informally hauling jerrycans of water throughout the community, "Water is what we miss ... It's better to do this than going around thieving."

In 2013, with funding from the Portuguese NGO the Gulbenkian Foundation, local architects Tiago Saraiva and Ricardo Morais designed a community kitchen with water access that was completed in 2014. As of 2015, the shantytown continued to exist, and also began to receive increasingly formal government recognition with proposals to implement a playground and a library. Water access via the communal kitchen is now funded by the Portuguese government.

== Spain ==
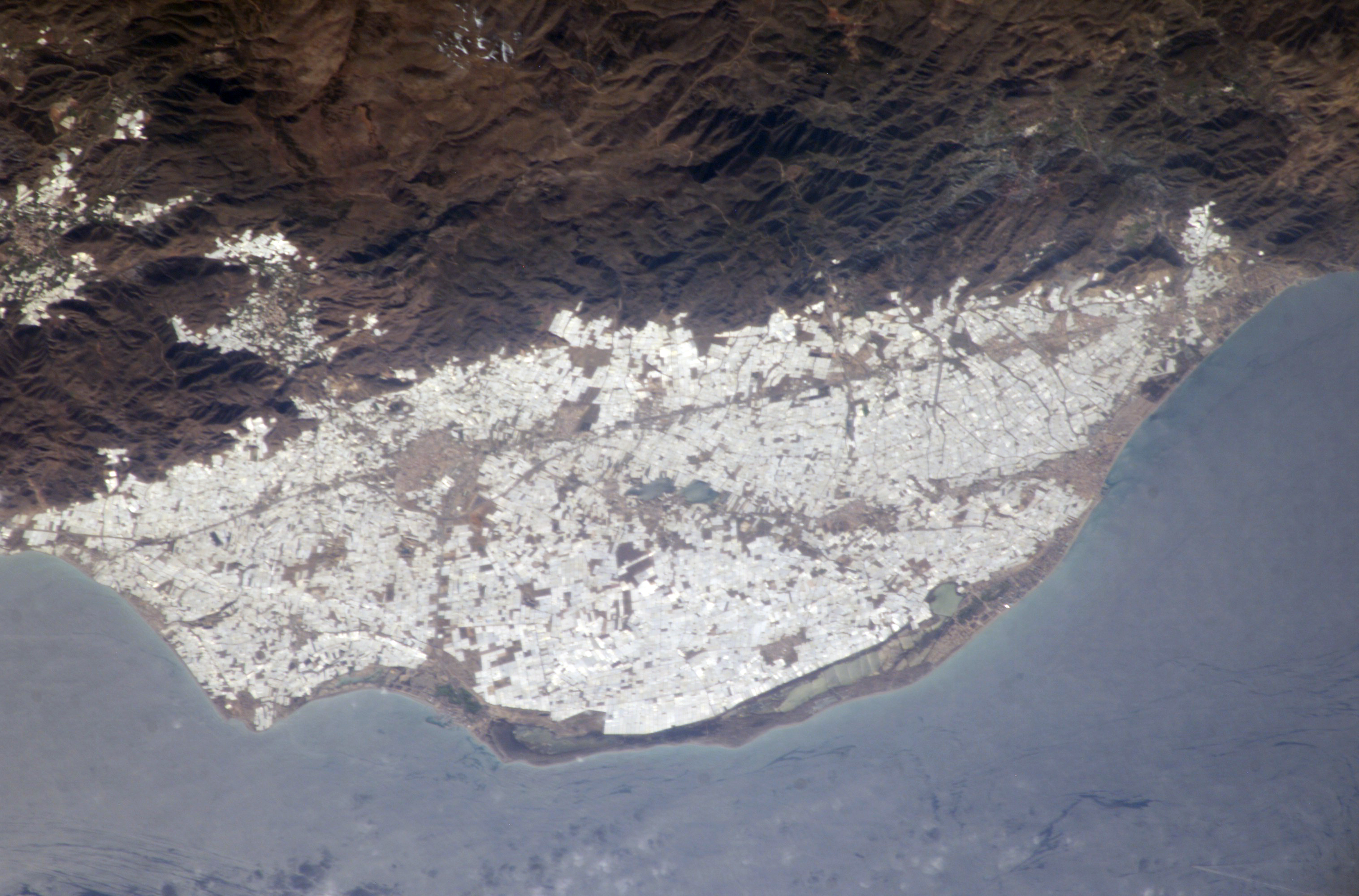
NASA view of greenhouses at El Ejido on the Campo de Dalías, Spain.

Racism within an environmental context has been documented in Spain, with North African and Romani ethnic communities being particularly affected, as well as migrant agricultural workers from throughout Africa, Asia, Latin America, and Southeast Europe.

As of 2007, there were an estimated 750,000 Romani (primarily Gitano Romani) living in Spain. According to the "Housing Map of the Roma Community in Spain, 2007", 12% of Romani live in substandard housing, while 4%, or 30,000 people, live in slums or shantytowns; furthermore, 12% resided in segregated settlements. According to the Roma Inclusion Index 2015, the denial of environmental benefits has been documented in some communities, with 4% of Romani in Spain not having access to running water, and 9% not having access to electricity.

Efforts to relocate shantytowns (chabolas), which according to a 2009 report by the EU Agency for Fundamental Rights were disproportionately inhabited by Romani persons, gained momentum in the late 1980s and 1990s. These initiatives were ostensibly designed to improve Romani living conditions, yet also had the purpose of being employed to vacate plots of real estate for development. In the words of a 2002 report on the situation of Romani in Spain, "thousands of Roma live in transitional housing, without any indication of when the transition period will end", a situation which has been attributed to the degradation of many transitional housing projects into ghettoes. In the case of many such relocations, Romani people have been moved to the peripheries of urban centers, often in environmentally problematic areas. In the case of Cañada Real Galiana, diverse ethnic groups including non-Romani Spaniards and Moroccans have been documented as experiencing issues of environmental injustice alongside Romani communities.

=== Migrant agricultural workers in southern Spain ===
Throughout southern Spain, migrant workers from Africa, Asia, Latin America, and South East Europe employed in the agricultural sector have experienced housing and labour conditions that involve racism within an environmental context, producing food for the larger European society while facing extreme deprivations.

In Murcia, lettuce pickers have complained of having to work illegally for salary by volume for employment agencies, instead of by the hour, meaning they are required to work more hours for less pay, while also experiencing unsafe exposure to pesticides. Workers have alleged that they have been forced to work in fields while pesticide spraying is active, a practice which is illegal under Spanish work safety laws.

Beginning in the 2000s in the El Ejido region of Andalusia, African (including large numbers of Moroccan) immigrant greenhouse workers have been documented as being faced with severe social marginalization and racism while simultaneously being exposed to extremely difficult working conditions with exposure to toxic pesticides. The El Ejido region has been described by environmentalists as a "sea of plastic" due to the expansive swaths of land covered by greenhouses, and has also been labeled "Europe's dirty little secret" due to the documented abuses of workers who help produce large portions of Europe's food supply.

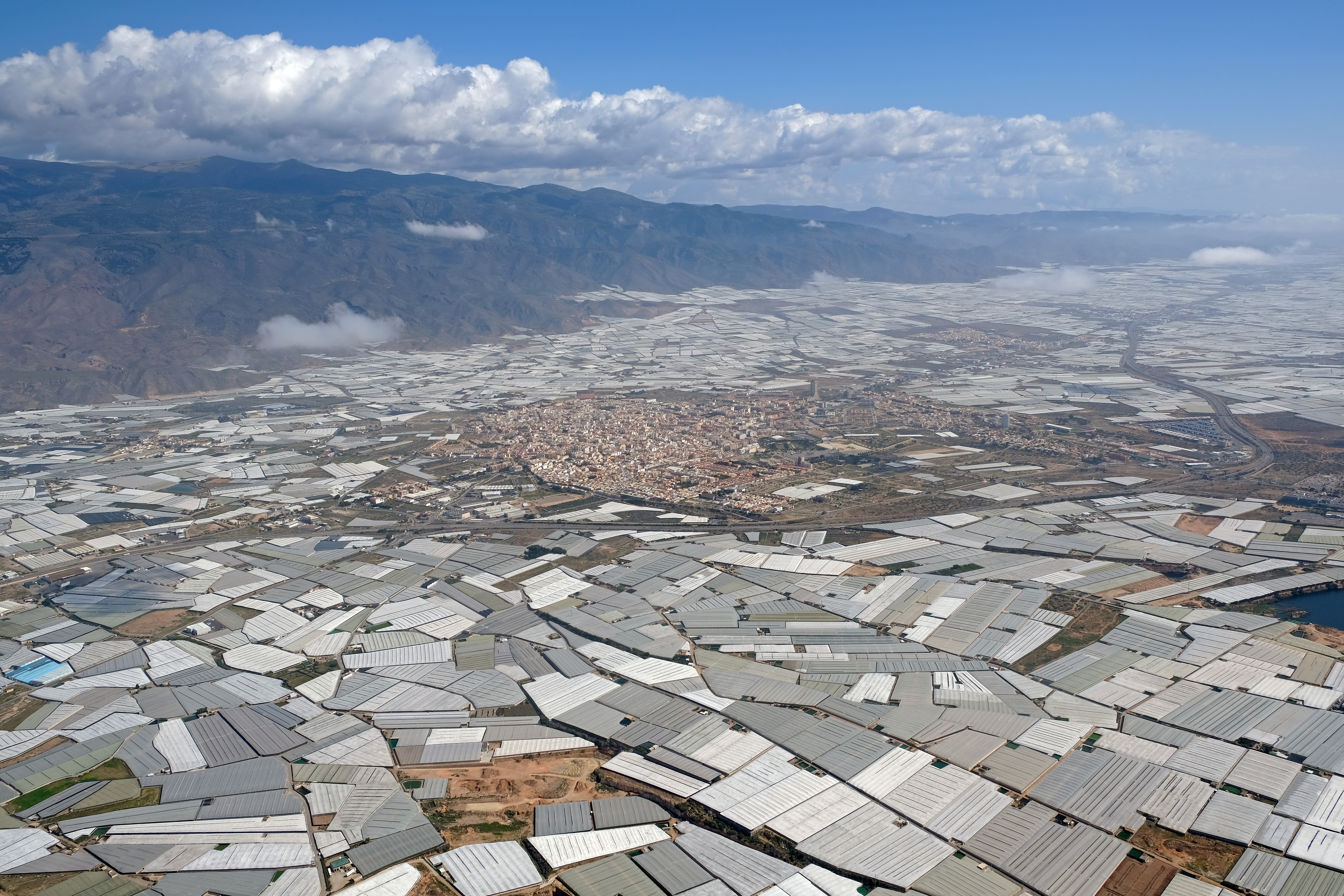
Greenhouses at El Ejido

In these greenhouses, workers are allegedly required to work under "slave-like" conditions in temperatures as high as 50 degrees Celsius with nonexistent ventilation, while being denied basic rest facilities and earning extremely low wages, among other workplace abuses. As of 2015, of 120,000 immigrant workers employed in the greenhouses, 80,000 are undocumented and not protected by Spanish labour legislation, according to Spitou Mendy of the Spanish Field Workers Syndicate (SOC). Workers have complained of ill health effects as a result of exposure to pesticides without proper protective equipment. Following the killing of two Spanish farmers and a Spanish woman in two separate incidents involving Moroccan citizens in February 2000, an outbreak of xenophobic violence took place in and around El Ejido, injuring 40 and displacing large numbers of immigrants. According to Angel Lluch

For three days on end, from 5 to 7 February, racist violence swept the town with immigrants as its target. For 72 hours hordes of farmers wielding iron bars, joined by youths from the high schools, beat up their victims, chased them through the streets and pursued them out among the greenhouses. Roads were blocked, barricaded and set aflame.

=== El Ejido Romani settlement ===
According to a 2006 report by the Secretariado General Gitano, a wall reportedly surrounded a predominantly Romani neighbourhood in El Ejido, Andalusia, isolating residents from basic services. In the words of the report,

In 1998, the town council erected a wall in a neighbourhood where many Roma families were living. This wall almost completely isolated the Roma as they were deprived of easy access to public transport and other services. Seven years later, this wall, which was to be provisional, still existed.

=== Galician Romani settlements ===
In Galicia, a 2007 study determined that segregated Romani settlements faced disproportionately high exposure to environmental burdens, finding

Around 10 per cent of these [segregated Romani settlements] are located near rubbish heaps, a percentage that is relatively high given that these heaps are currently being dismantled in Spain. Two out of 3 of these sites are located in places where flooding is a serious risk. Forty one per cent of the sites are also in close proximity to heavy car and train traffic. It is also important to add that in 60 per cent of these sites the number of inhabitants is currently increasing, while the population is decreasing in only 15 per cent of them.

=== Asperones (Málaga) transitional Romani settlement ===
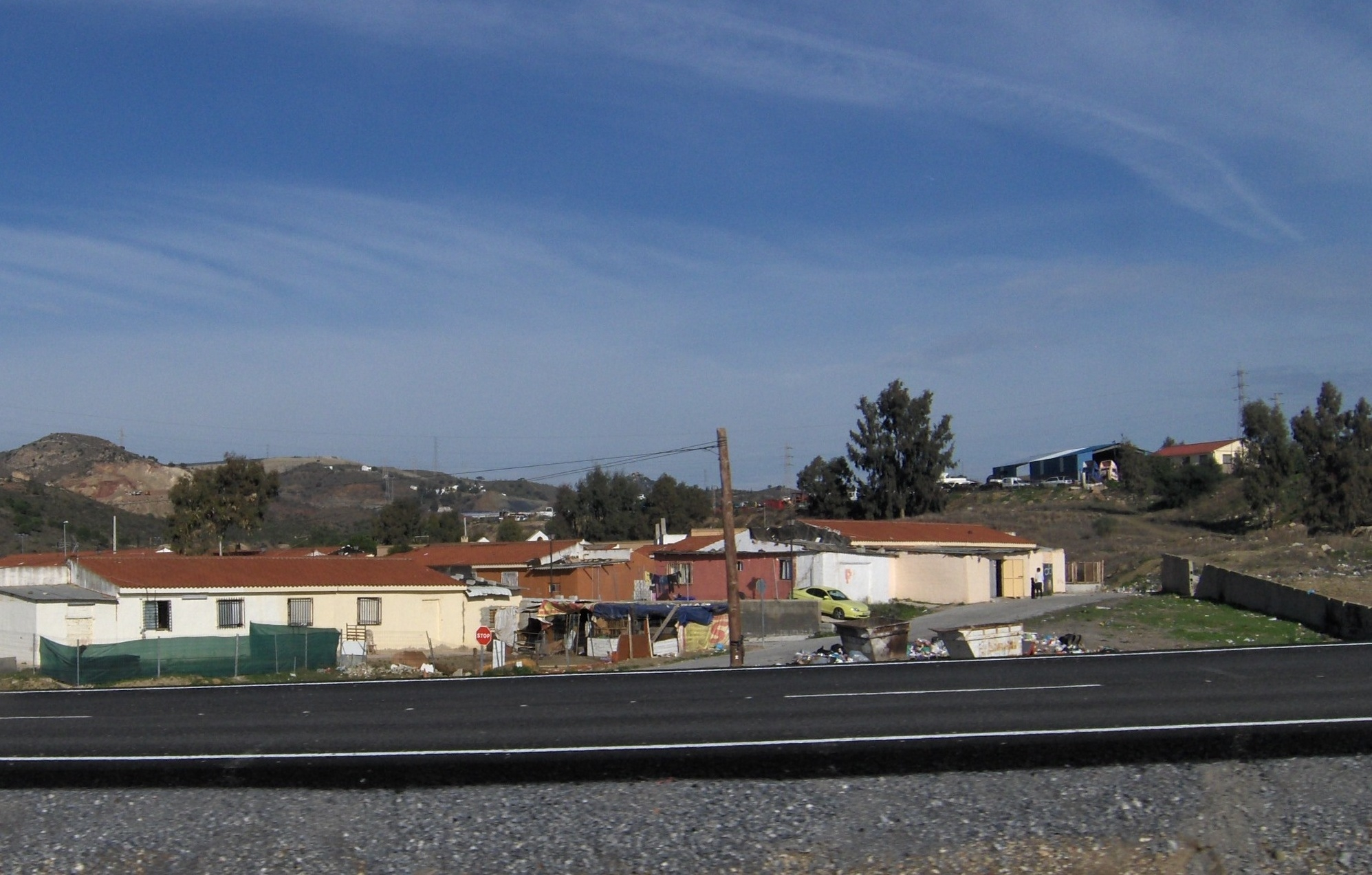
Romani settlement, Asperones, Málaga, Spain

In the late 1980s, under the "Plan for the Eradication of Shanty-towns in Malaga", the transitional housing site of Asperones was constructed for Romani in Málaga. Constructed in close proximity to a former garbage landfill and a cemetery, conditions in the settlement have been described as harmful for its residents, with one 2002 report on the housing situation of Romani in Spain referring to Asperones as "one of the most conflict-ridden and isolated settlements in Málaga". As of 2015, 1000 residents continued to live in the "transitional" settlement, and 50% have been described as having to rely on scrap metal collection for income.

=== El Cascayu transitional Romani settlement ===
In 2002, 16 Romani families in El Cascayu were relocated under a transitional housing scheme to what has been described by the organization SOS Racismo as a discriminatory, isolated, and environmentally marginalized housing location. According to SOS Racismo,

... the last housing units built within [the] eradication of marginalization plan in El Cascayu, where 16 families will be re-housed, is a way of chasing these families out of the city. They will live in a place surrounded by a 'sewer river,' a railroad trail, an industrial park and a highway. So far away from education centres, shops, recreational places and without public transport, it will be physically difficult for them to get out of there.

=== Cañada Real Galiana ===
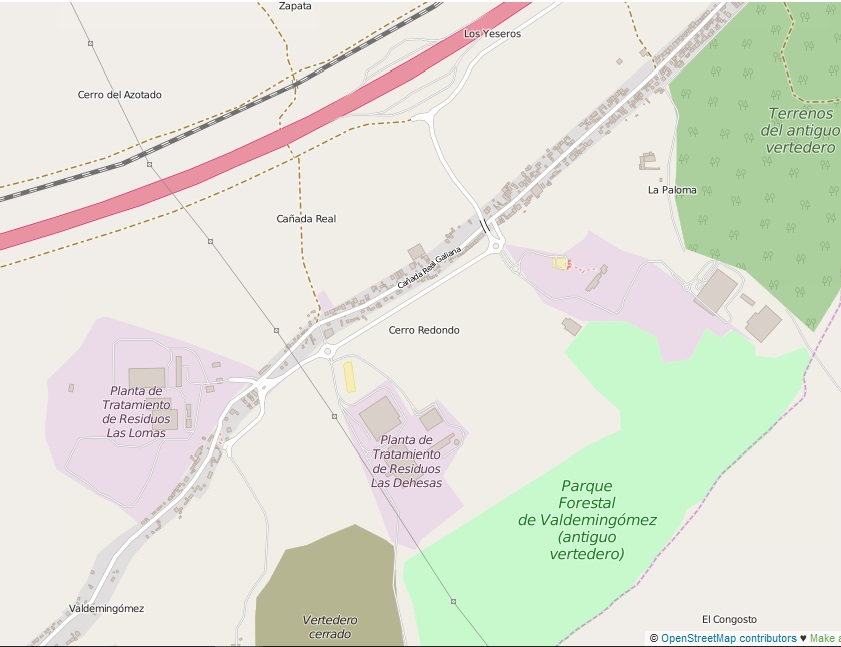
Map excerpt of Valdemingómez district, Cañada Real Galiana, Madrid. The long grey strip along Cañada Real Galiana roadway and transhumance trail denotes the 16 kilometre-long, 75 metre-wide shantytown where 8,600 persons reside. Rectangular shapes denote structures.

On the outskirts of Madrid, 8,600 persons inhabit the informal settlement of Cañada Real Galiana, also known as La Cañada Real Riojana or La Cañada Real de las merinas. It constitutes the largest shantytown in Western Europe. The settlement is located along 16 kilometres of a 75 metre-wide, 400 kilometre-long environmentally protected transhumance trail between Getafe and Coslada, part of a 125,000 kilometre network of transhumance routes throughout Spain. Certain areas of the unplanned and unauthorized settlement are economically affluent, working-class, or middle-class and are viewed as desirable areas for many (particularly Moroccan immigrants who have faced discrimination in the broader Spanish rental market). However, much of the Cañada Real Galiana is subject to severe environmental racism, particularly in the Valdemingómez district of the settlement.

In the mid-1990s the Madrid government pursued initiatives to eliminate the shantytowns surrounding the city. One such shantytown settlement, Los Focos, was the largest in Spain, and also composed predominantly of ethnic Romani (of Spanish nationality). During this time, the municipal government, under the conservative Popular Party, set out to initiate plans for the relocation of Los Focos to Cañada Real Galiana, where 100 single-storey houses were to be constructed in immediate proximity to the Madrid garbage incinerator, a dump, and an illegal pig farm. In the opinion of Gonick,

In such physical proximity, relocated bodies and the city's refuse would face certain, constant coexistence. The blatant disregard for the health and safety of this population betrays the state's racialized vision of their urban futures: like sacks of garbage, these residents represented blight on the city, to be discarded out of sight. Such alliances between bodies and filth are of course ancient tropes in the production of spaces of value and inequality (Douglas 1966; McClintock 1995).

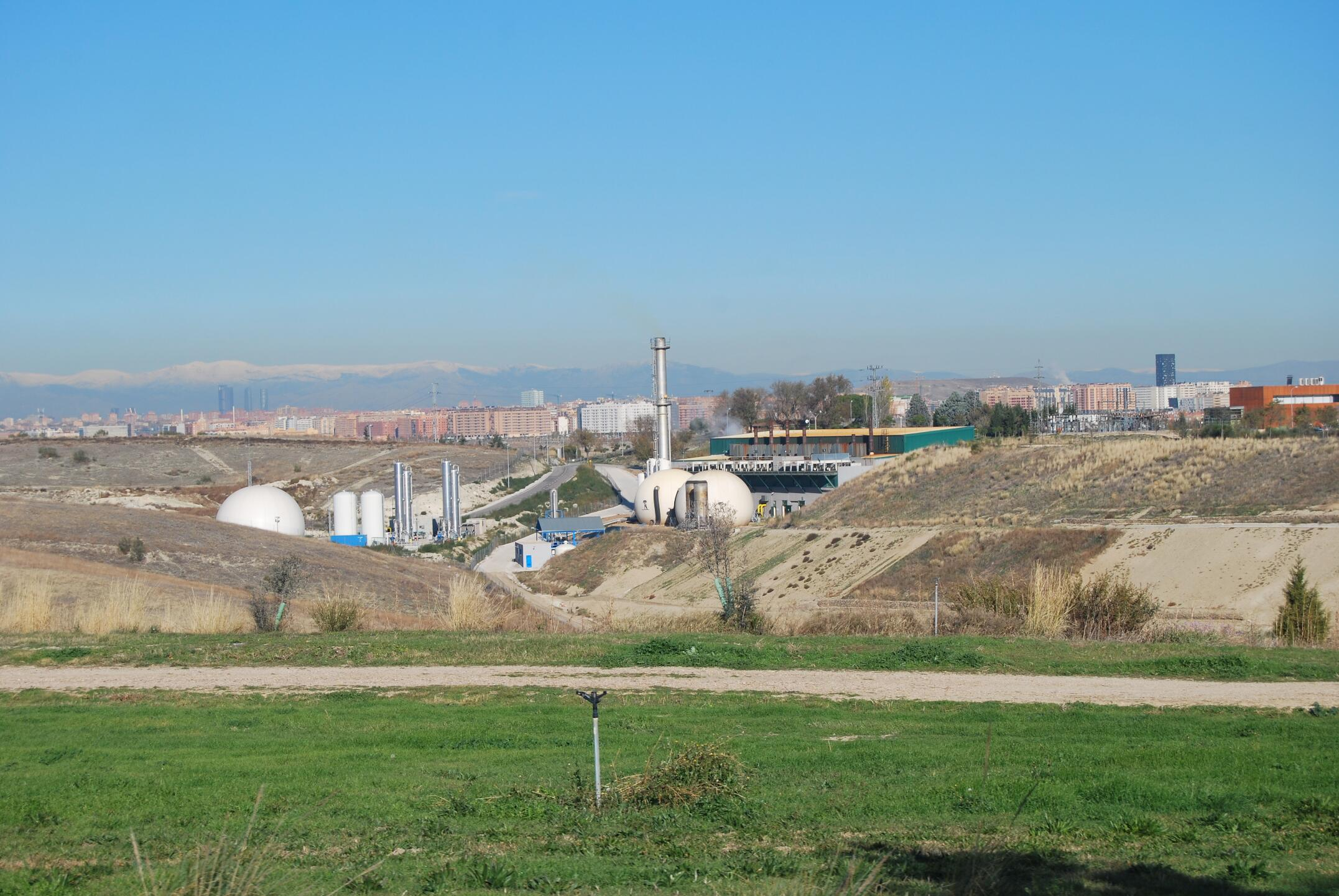
Waste processing facilities near the predominantly Romani settlement of Valdemingómez

Negative publicity led to a cancellation of the relocation program, although by that point, residents were already starting to be relocated to Valdemingómez. Currently, Valdemingómez is a low-income yet highly multi-ethnic shantytown. Located south of Highway E-901 and east of Highway M 50, Valdemingómez is named after the waste processing, incineration, and dumping facilities which it is adjacent to, and is a site of extreme social marginalization. An estimated 4,500 trucks a day pass through the main road of the settlement daily en route to the dump and recycling facilities, raising concerns over safety, particularly for children. There are no sidewalks, traffic lights, or pedestrian crossings along the road, and several children have been killed by trucks.

In 2003, a significant number of Spanish Romani were displaced by the demolition of the Las Barranquilas and El Salobral shantytowns, and subsequently relocated to Valdemingómez. According to Rubio, the primary economy of Las Barranquilas and El Salobral was the illegal drug trade; the relocation of Romani residents has resulted in an influx of drug traffic to Valdemingómez. Nearby is the separate settlement of El Gallinero (which is not part of Cañada Real Galiana, despite its proximity) which is composed of migrant Romani from Romania; El Gallinero was settled following a fire which destroyed their previous homes in a distinct district of Valdemingómez. El Gallinero, which has a population of 400 residents (half of whom are children, many of whom do not attend school) lacks adequate street lighting and access to clean water, and significant numbers of its inhabitants are faced with addictions issues.

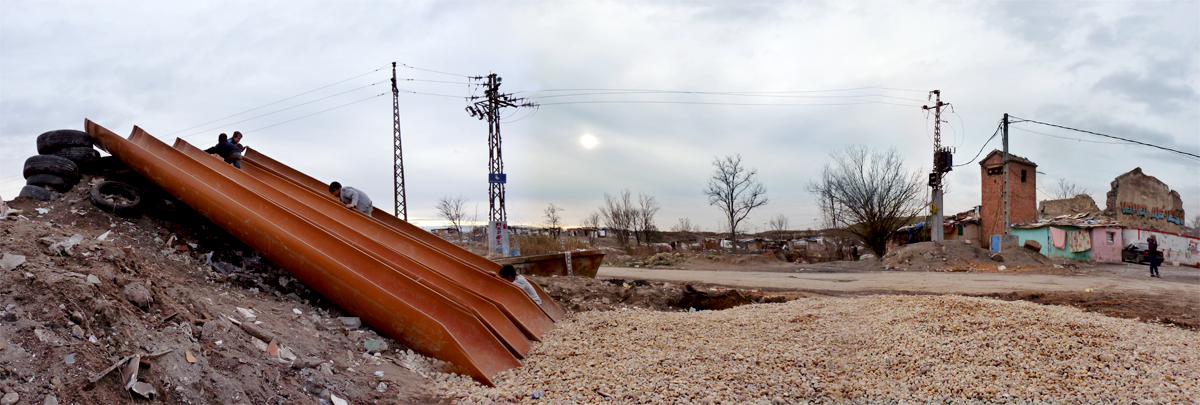
Children's play area, Valdemingómez district, Cañada Real Galiana

During a 2007 effort by the Madrid government to demolish Cañada Real Galiana, violent clashes between police and residents took place. Mainstream news publications such as ABC, the official Spanish state media company RTVE, and El Mundo published stories which sensationalized the conditions of the settlement, arguably exaggerating the scale of the drug trade and other criminal activities there, while also making unfounded claims implying potential terrorist activity among residents, allegedly portraying the settlement as a site of "racial difference with dangerous others".

In the context of the 15 M movement and an increasingly unaffordable and inaccessible housing market, many people in Spain identified with the struggles of Cañada Real Galiana residents, and activism surrounding the community received significant support from individuals and groups of diverse backgrounds from within Spanish society. Following a series of protests and social activism, a process of court battles took place over the continuing demolitions, centered on Article 47 of the Spanish Constitution which guarantees the right to housing. In 2013, a landmark decision at the European High Court of Human Rights was delivered in favour of Cañada Real Galiana residents, effectively ending the demolitions and protecting the existence of the settlement under Spanish constitutional law.

Following the decision, as part of an effort to improve the situation in the settlement, the regional government of Madrid negotiated with municipalities neighbouring Cañada Real Galiana to conduct a formal census of the settlement. Contrary to earlier mainstream media reports that the settlement was overwhelmingly Moroccan, sixty percent of residents were found to be non-Romani Spaniards, with the remainder being a diverse group consisting of other ethnicities; also, the population of the settlement was determined to be 8,600 residents instead of 40,000 as some sources had earlier claimed. While environmental racism and environmental inequality continue to be major issues in the settlement for many residents in certain neighborhoods, the census revealed an arguably complex picture of the social situation in Cañada Real Galiana.

== Italy ==
Romani and migrant populations in Italy experience documented practices of racism and segregation within a context of environmental concerns and environmental inequality. Among migrant populations in Italy, environmental inequality has been documented in relation to agricultural labor through exposure to pesticides, low wages, and poor working conditions.

With regards to the Romani presence in Italy, legal scholar Jennifer Illuzzi uses a term called the "state of exception" to argue that liberal Italian legal contexts have historically created scenarios in which "Romanies are under intense scrutiny, but juridically invisible". Illuzzi argues that as a result of the "state of exception", contemporary Romani communities in Italy become easily subjected to criminalization, denial of citizenship or national status, and social exclusion, notably in places such as government-implemented Nomad Camps.

In Italy today, many Romani settlements (including Nomad Camps) exist within segregated contexts where both environmental concerns (such as lack of clean water access, toxic waste exposure, and proximity to highways and industrial areas) and issues of criminalization are present. In Campania, Romani residents have been involved in the mass burning of waste and have been housed in extreme proximity to a hazardous waste site that has been likened by one government official to Chernobyl in terms of cleanup requirements and risk to human health.

=== Nomad Camps and related sites ===
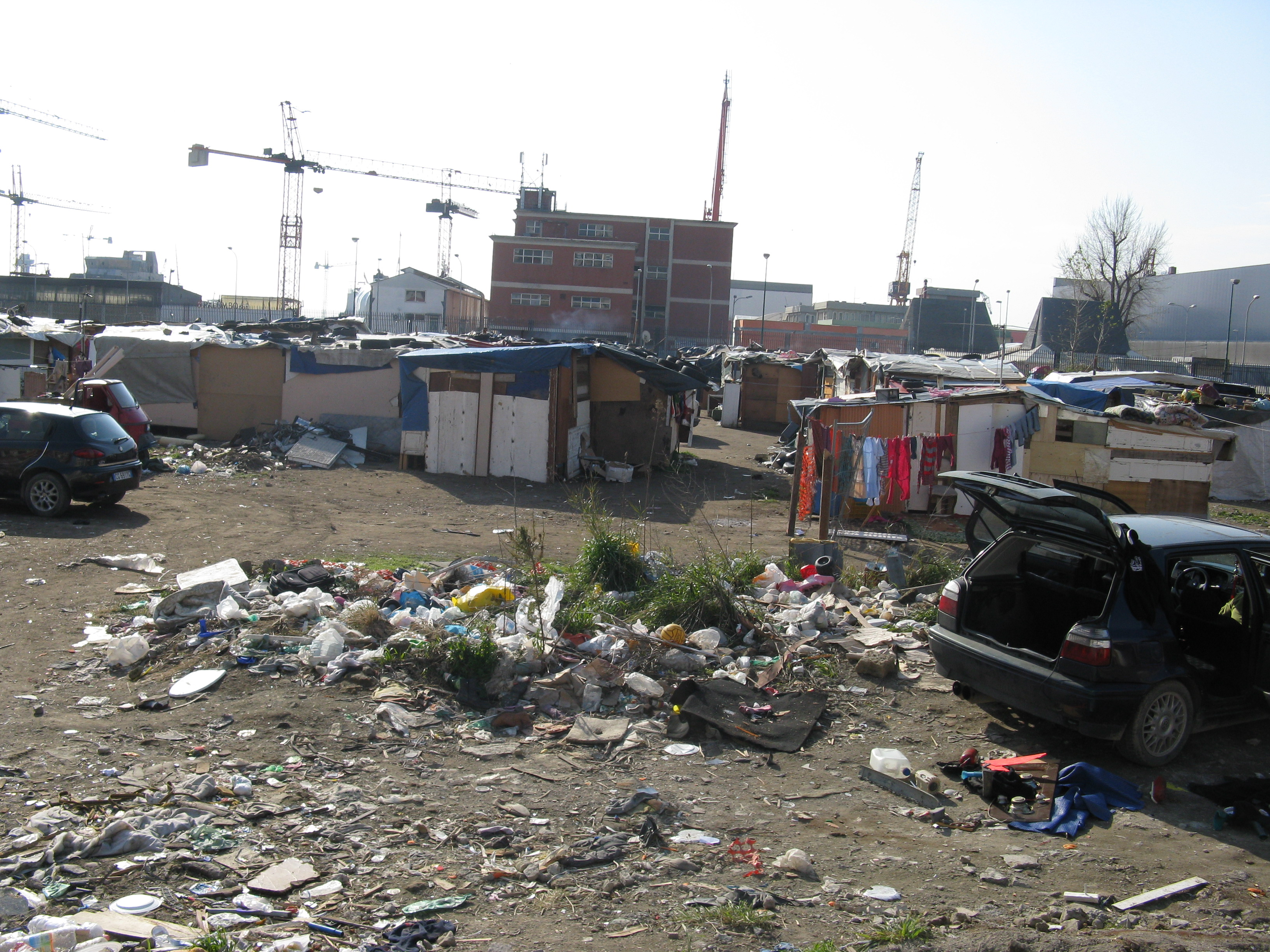
Romani camp, Naples, 2012, situated next to the harbour.

In Rome, over 4,000 Romani persons (not to be confused with Romans) live in encampments authorized by the Italian national and Roman municipal governments. As of 2013, 40,000 Romani persons were living in camps throughout Italy. In response to the Italian government's alleged "Nomad Emergency" in 2008 during which a law was passed stating that Romani communities were causing a "situation of grave social alarm, with possible repercussions for the local population in terms of public order and security", an emergency "Nomad Plan" was devised by the municipal government of Rome. The European Commission also granted legal passage for the Italian government to move forward with plans to systematically fingerprint Romani communities.

Under the "Nomad Emergency" decree, special funds were allocated by the government to close informal Romani settlements and encampments in Rome, and to resettle a maximum of 6,000 Romani persons into 13 authorized camps. According to Amnesty International, "The decree was later declared unfounded and unlawful by the Council of State in November 2011 and by the Supreme Court in April 2013." By 2013, living conditions in these camps had deteriorated severely due to overcrowding and a lack of utilities and other basic infrastructure. As of 2010, six of the camps were located far from residential areas, situated outside Rome's Grande Raccordo Anulare, the city's orbital highway. As of 2013, one camp, Castel Romano, was inaccessible by public transportation, and was located along a notably dangerous motorway, the Via Pontina. Another camp, Nuovo Barbuta, was situated between a railroad, Rome's orbital highway, and the runway of Ciampino airport. As of 2013, due to a lack of public transportation, residents of the Nuovo Barbuto camp had to walk long distances along an unpaved shoulder of a busy road in order to leave the camp; furthermore, they were subject to air and noise pollution from the nearby airport.

In 2015, 378 residents, most of whom were Romani, were documented residing at the Ex Cartiera housing shelter under extremely substandard, cramped, and unhygienic conditions. Prior to its closure in 2016, it was cited by the European Roma Rights Centre for being located in an isolated area of a heavy industrial district known as via Salaria 971, located in immediate proximity to both a municipal solid waste treatment facility and a high-volume highway.

In Milan, the Social Emergency Shelter (SES) housed predominantly Romani residents in via Lombroso 99 district until 2016, located in an "old industrial area, alongside a busy railway track". Families housed in the facility lived in shipping containers, with 16 to 27 persons residing in each container. In 2010 another authorized settlement, Triboniano Camp, was "squeezed between a railway track, cemetery, and container storage" in an industrial area of Milan.

=== Hazardous waste in Campania and exposure to Romani settlements ===
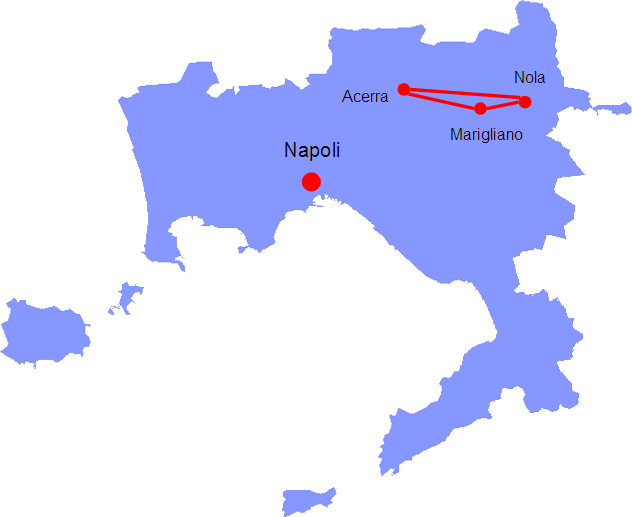
Map of the Triangle of Death

In Italy, an estimated 11.6 million tons of waste are illegally disposed of each year. According to ex-Camorra member Carmine Schiavone, millions of tons of waste from factories in northern Italy have been illegally disposed of in the region north of Naples for decades, allegedly with Mafia and Camorra involvement and the complicity of government authorities and police. In 2004, the area surrounding Acerra was labeled by British medical journal The Lancet Oncology as a "triangle of death" where the incidence of two-headed sheep has been recorded.

According to Italian environmental organization Legambiente, in 2012 the total financial value of the illegal garbage industry in Italy was estimated at over 16 billion euros. Over the course of testimony delivered to a secret parliamentary investigative committee in Rome on October 7, 1997 (made public in 2013), Schiavone alleged that nuclear waste from East Germany was also secretly transported to the region, along with other wastes containing dioxin, asbestos, and tetrachloroethylene. Campania has since shifted from being a dumping destination and is now a transit point for the export of hazardous waste to China, and, according to Gen. Sergio Costa, commander of the Naples region for Italy's environmental police, the Balkans and Eastern Europe.

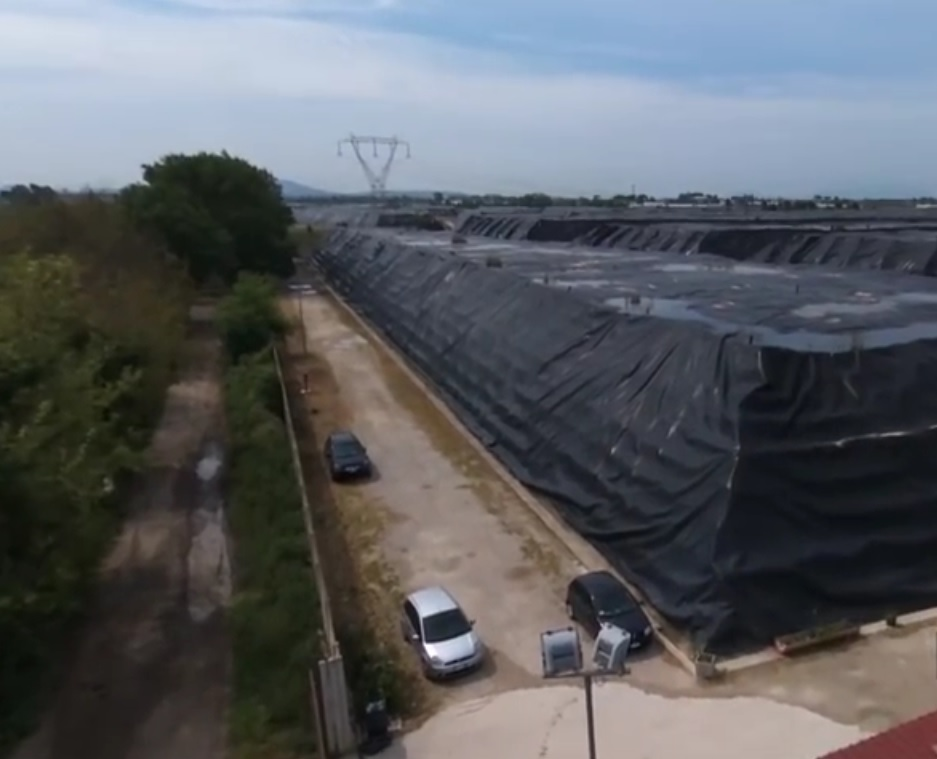
Taverna del Re hazardous waste facility, Giugliano

As of 2014, 5,281 contaminated sites and suspected waste dumps have been located by American military investigators. Meanwhile, the region's 500,000 inhabitants have been disproportionately affected by medical ailments; according to Antonio Merfella of the Italian Cancer Research Institute in Naples, the region of Campania has the highest rate of infertility in Italy; in the province of Naples, lung cancer among non-smokers is increasing, while tumors in general have increased 47 percent among males. The region has also become known for disproportionate cases of autism. Concerns over the safety of food production in the fertile agricultural region (much of which is still believed to be uncontaminated) persist.

Many of the most seriously affected people in the region are Romani residents from settlements near Giugliano and the greater Naples area which have been subjected to extreme exposure of pollution and toxic waste. According to Los Angeles Times journalist Tracy Wilkinson, Romani boys in 2008 were hired throughout the region by the Camorra to set fires to piles of waste, creating significant quantities of toxic smoke over vast swathes of land.

One of the contaminated Romani camps in Giugliano was unofficial, populated by 500 persons most of whom were migrants from the former Yugoslavia. Built in 1991 and home to 85 families, it was documented in 2010 as a series of camps located "northwest of Naples, at the outer limits of the urban centre, on the external ring-road following the State Highway 162," surrounded by industrial lands. Originally situated on open farmland, the so-called "spontaneous"-status unauthorized settlement became surrounded by industries and disposal sites that were later owned by the Government of Campania, which developed a 24-hour surveillance and barricade system surrounding the camp, contracted to the private security firm Falko Security S.R.I.S. According to Raffaella Inglese in Mapping the Invisible, environmental justice concerns for residents in 2010 entailed

noise pollution produced by the neighbouring factories, air pollution from the same factories and [an] ex-centre for refuse collection; pollution from the burnt refuse; the danger of the roads being very near their homes and the areas in which their children play; the dirt and run-off from the illegal dumping of toxic industrial waste in the immediate vicinity and the necessity to wash themselves outside which is dangerous for children.

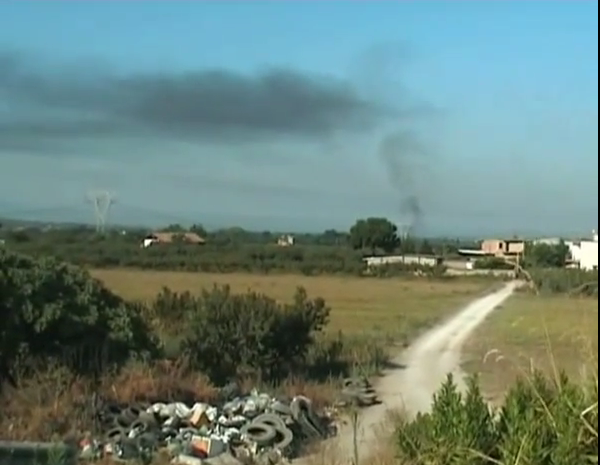
Fire burning near Giugliano, likely due to illegal waste incineration

Another environmentally toxic camp, Masseria del Pozzo, was also located in the Giugliano region. This camp, established in March 2013, was an official settlement forcibly created following the eviction of other camps in the Giugliano region, including a previous site that was contaminated by hazardous waste. The Masseria del Pozzo camp was home to approximately 260 persons in March 2016. In 2014, the population of the camp was estimated to be 500 persons, with approximately 200–400 children, according to various residents. According to the European Roma Rights Centre, the community had resided at various camps within the Naples region for the past 25 years and "almost all of the [former] inhabitants of the camp are residing lawfully in Italy; they generally have permanent resident status in Italy and some are Italian citizens".

The settlement was located next to the Masseria del Pozzo toxic waste dump where persistent issues of hazardous biogas leaks from the landfill caused severe health concerns, and was also surrounded by at least three other hazardous landfill sites such as Resit and Novambiente, as well as lands contaminated by illegal toxic sludge disposal. In the words of Der Spiegel journalist Walter Mayr, "500 Roma live in shacks and caravans at the foot of what is probably Europe's nastiest landfill, stuffed with, among other things, toxic sludge and dioxin. It is a place where, in the opinion of the responsible government commissioner, a 'sarcophagus like in Chernobyl' would be necessary to protect the public."

Residents of the former settlement reported mysterious deaths and disabilities among children and youths, as well as pneumonia and other sicknesses among children. According to former camp resident Giuliano Seferovic, authorities originally informed residents that they would only be placed at the location for a month; this promised timeframe extended to two months, and then nearly a year by the time of the interview. In a video interview with Mario De Biase, Government Commissioner for Reclaims (Land Reclamation), De Biase discusses the issue of toxic gases:

Surely these landfills are perhaps the most dangerous for their potential environmental disaster and effects not only on the environment but directly on human health ... They are all gases coming from the landfill. They transmigrate through the permeability of the soil and arrive into this pit where they find their way to come out in the air. One cannot say that a child who lives 24 hours a day between the smoke of the mineralization of VOC [volatile organic compounds] of the well, who lives and plays on soils contaminated by hazardous waste, who crosses the road for 5 meters and ends up on a landfill where there are all the fumes of biogas and leachate, obviously I do not think that is good for the child, neither for adults.

In the words of former resident Rashid Osmanic, interviewed while living in the camp,

With biogas here we all die, no guns, no weapons, nothing! So we die. Two or three years here, and we all die, children get diseases.

Following the announcement of the planned closure of the settlement, Romani rights organizations such as Associazione 21 luglio and the European Roma Rights Centre condemned plans to forcibly relocate the community to a new segregated camp, with Associazione 21 luglio expressing particular concern over the potential creation of a larger segregated "mega-camp" where further social marginalization could take place. On June 21, 2016, the entire camp was forcibly evicted without written notice and relocated to a new camp in an industrial area near Giugliano. The new site is located at a former fireworks factory, which was destroyed in a 2015 explosion. According to human rights observers, the secluded site, which is surrounded by wild vegetation on three sides and a wall, is contaminated with what appears to be asbestos and unidentified potentially explosive substances, and is littered with sharp objects that pose a danger to children. Residents were not given any say in selecting a new site, and faced homelessness if they did not move to the new camp, which does not have any housing, sewerage, electricity, or adequate water supply. As of February 2016, the Ministry of Interior and Region Campania have secured funding for a new permanent, segregated replacement site with 44 prefabricated dwellings. No funding has been committed for integration measures such as education, health, employment, or community programs, prompting the European Roma Rights Centre to describe the plan as "a long term plan for segregation".

=== Migrant agricultural workers ===
In both Southern and Northern Italy, large numbers of migrant workers from Africa and Asia produce agricultural goods within a context of severe social and environmental marginalization, lacking access to clean water, utilities, housing, and wage security while facing exposure to harsh working conditions and harmful pesticides. As of 2015, the Italian Association for Legal Studies on Immigration (ASGI) estimated that there were likely close to 500,000 regular and irregular foreign agricultural workers in Italy, of whom 100,000 were believed to be at risk of severe marginalization with regards to living conditions and social mobility.

According to a report by Amnesty International, there is "a causal link between labour exploitation of migrant workers and the measures adopted by the Italian government with the stated view of controlling and regulating migration flows". The report focused on the Latina and the Caserta areas where large numbers of workers are of Indian (mostly Punjabi) and African origin respectively, the latter of whom are mostly from Burkina Faso, Ghana, Nigeria, Algeria, Egypt, Morocco, and Tunisia. In Calabria, immigrant fruit pickers for the orange juice industry have been identified as subject to notably exploitative social conditions.

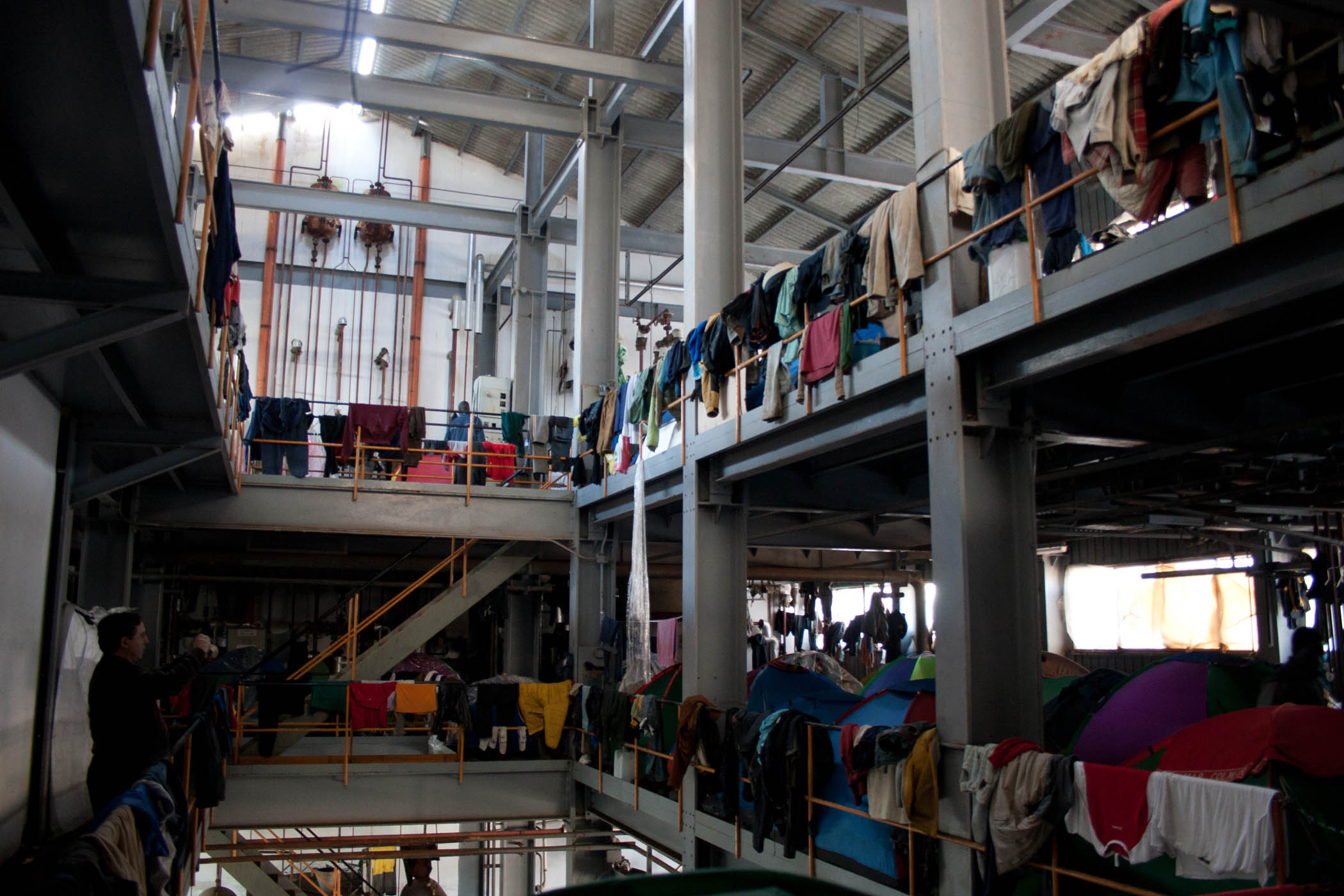
Migrant agricultural worker housing, Rosarno, Italy

While some migrant agricultural workers are paid well and welcomed as economic contributors for helping fill jobs that established Italians are often reluctant to perform, the average wage in Italy for migrant agricultural workers is only 33 dollars a day. In the Latina area alone, 61% of agricultural employers were found by Italian regulatory inspectors to be in contravention of social security and employment laws. In Caserta, migrant agricultural workers partake in the tomato, fruit, dairy, watermelon, and orange industries, often under exploitative or substandard employment conditions. In particular, the fast-growing and lucrative Italian tomato industry, which sources 60 percent of processed tomatoes consumed in the UK and half the entire European Union supply, producing a total export value of 1.5 billion Euros in 2014, has been identified as a significant source of workplace abuse. While 70% of Italy's tomato production is generated from the areas of Puglia and Emilia Romagna, severe abuses of tomato pickers have been documented throughout Italy, including most provinces.

On January 7, 2010, there was an outbreak of violence in the citrus-producing town of Rosarno, Calabria in the aftermath of a drive-by shooting that targeted two migrants. Following the shooting, hundreds of migrants marched through the town to protest their living conditions, an event that ultimately led to confrontations with riot police and the torching of vehicles. According to Amnesty International, "The clashes were followed by a "migrant manhunt" carried out by some local residents. In a number of separate incidents during the following days, two migrants were reportedly beaten with iron bars, five deliberately run over by a car and a further two injured by shot-gun pellets. In total, 53 persons were hospitalised, including 21 migrants, 14 local residents and 18 police officers." Following the incident, a mass detention of migrants remaining in Rosarno ensued. In the words of one worker from Ghana,

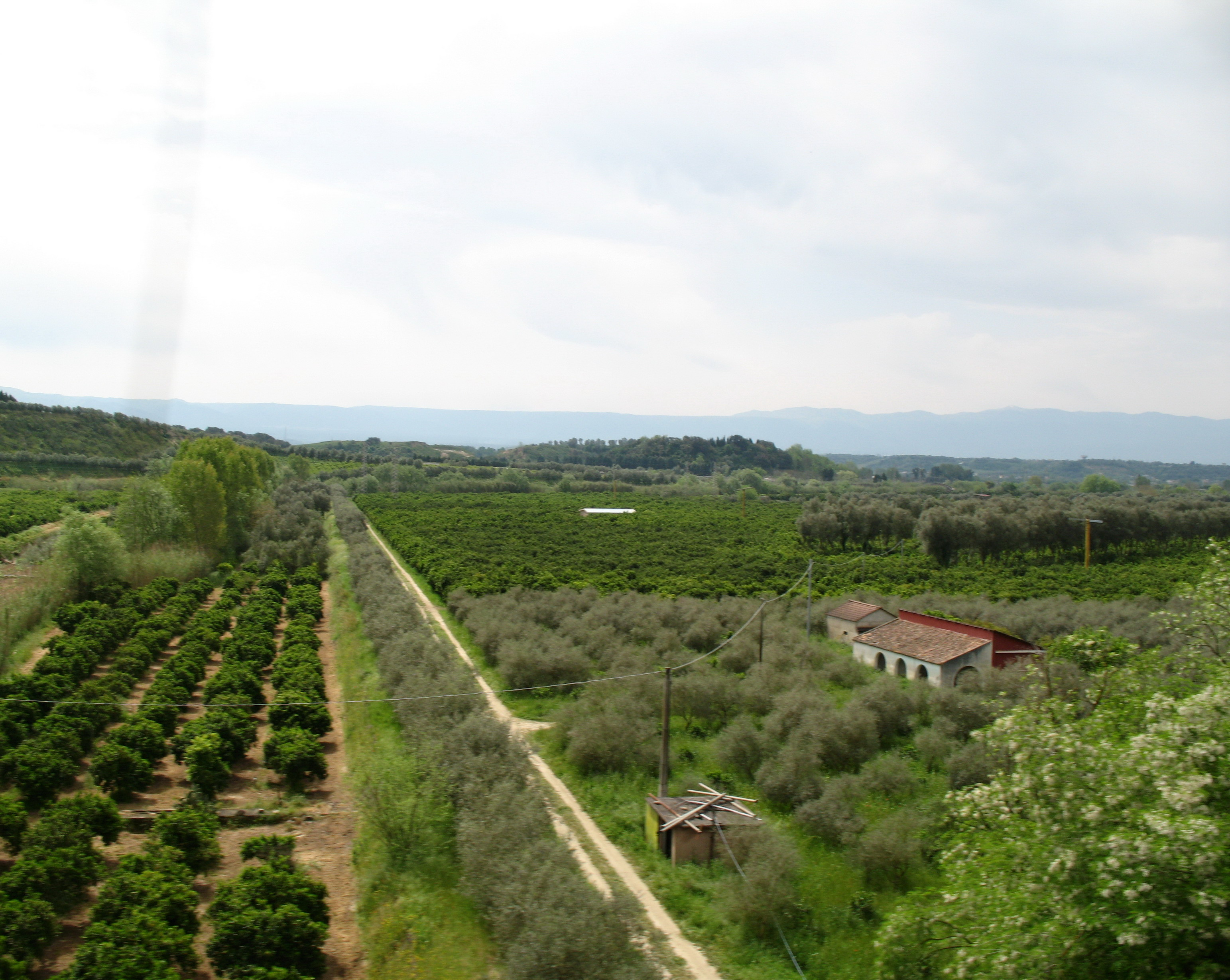
Citrus orchards near Rosarno, where anti-immigrant violence and clashes occurred January 2010

In Rosarno we were working from morning to night, picking oranges, for 25 euros a day; but we had to pay 5 euros for transport, so we had only 20 euros left. There were some abandoned factories where one would build a shelter with some cardboard – one was called the Ghana ghetto. That day [i.e. the day of the clashes, 7/8 January 2010] we decided to go and buy something in town. Some boys were shot by Italians. We decided to do a demonstration about that, because that was not the first time. That's where all the problems started. There were fights between blacks and whites. But we did not want to fight the Italians; we wanted to go to the Comune [the local administration]. No Italian would pick oranges for 25 euros.

A major issue for migrant workers in the Rosarno citrus industry are health concerns stemming from exposure to chemicals such as pesticides. According to healthcare worker Dr. Luca Corso of the outreach medical organization Emergency, which assists immigrants who are frequently denied access to Italian hospitals, many workers have shown signs of ailments caused by working in orchards where tree spraying is active. In the words of Dr. Corso,

We've started to see, particularly since the beginning of January, some cases that can be linked to working activities; mainly the improper use of pesticides and fungicides used during this season. It's mostly cases of irritative phenomenon, for example contact dermatitis in exposed areas (hands and face) or conjunctivitis...because the eyes are exposed.

According to Nino Quaranta, founder of agricultural rights advocacy group SosRosarno, an underlying issue for low wages is the economic challenge confronting many smaller-scale farmers. Most are small independent operators who are often unable to recover costs due to the current price of oranges, which has been affected by international competition and a price crash, thereby compelling them to seek the cheapest labor possible. Contributing to this pressure, market monopolization has been identified by local agriculture advocates as an aggravating factor. According to Pietro Molinaro of the Calabrian Organisation of Producers, "The problem this area has faced for some years is that the big multinational drinks companies underpay for the juice. They put pressure on the small local processing plants that press the juice."

== Greece ==
Romani communities in Greece face severe, widespread issues of social and geographic segregation, including denial of access to environmental means of sustenance such as land, electricity, and clean water, as well as exposure to pollution and other ecological issues. Similar issues exist for predominantly Pakistani and Bangladeshi migrants, especially those working in the agricultural sector. In some cases, Romani communities have been identified for actions resulting in environmental damage, such as unauthorized waste incineration and negligently starting forest fires. According to Pavlou and Lykovardi,

The persistence of extreme socio-spatial segregation of Roma and its underlying causes has resulted in acute social exclusion. The spatial segregation of habitats is a pattern closely connected to their socio-economic exclusion which leads them to seek and find unoccupied and isolated areas in order to set up temporary or long-term encampments with makeshift shacks ... the consequences of their marginalisation become the reasons – and legitimising arguments – for their perennial segregation and exclusion in a persistent vicious circle of stereotyping, state inertia and local hostility.

The 2004 Athens Olympics has also been cited as an event which has contributed to environmental marginalization of Romani communities. An estimated 2,700 Romani persons in Greece have either been dislocated from or denied access to housing as a result of policies related to preparation for the Games.

=== Unauthorized waste incineration and recycling ===
In 2008, inhabitants of a Romani settlement in Athens reportedly burned large amounts of rubber, tires, and other garbage, causing serious pollution in the settlement and exacerbating hostile relations with neighbouring communities, including allegations of Romani slum dwellers discharging firearms at authorities attempting to extinguish the fires. Informal recycling industries engaged in by Romani have been identified as a health concern. In July 2008, unauthorized fires in Romani settlements, started for cleaning scrap metal by burning, were identified by authorities as being the source of major wildfires which caused significant economic damage as well as severe air-quality issues for neighbouring Athens.

As of 2013, there was active waste scavenging by Romani persons at the Fyli landfill in Athens. In May 2013, following a previous action by police to guard the landfill from trespassers, an influx of unspecified numbers of Romani and immigrants led to the site being temporarily closed by regional governor Yiannis Sgouros. Sgouros stated that the closure, reportedly largely symbolic in nature, was in response to what had been described by news publication Ekathimerini as a "dangerous situation" at the landfill, requesting the government to halt "an unchecked influx of people". In the words of Sgouros, "The situation at the landfill is out of control. People, garbage trucks, bulldozers and trash are all in the same space with the constant risk of an accident." In April 2011, two persons of Pakistani ethnicity were murdered by Romani individuals armed with rifles at the Fyli dump. Three Pakistani individuals were also injured, and Romani dwellings were set on fire in retaliation for the killings. According to police, the incident was part of an ongoing conflict between Pakistani and Romani groups over access to recyclables at the landfill.

On the Greek island of Kalymnos, Romani persons scavenge waste and set fire to the local landfill to help clear debris, according to Kalymnos deputy mayor Mikes Rigas. In an interview at the landfill site, Rigas acknowledged the issue, stating

Look, we have a problem more generally with Roma individuals who come and gather materials from here and set fires, of course in the summer with the heat, fires start by themselves with the amount of material and plastic that there is. I don't want to say it is only them causing the problem, but they are part of it.

Smoke from the landfill, which has been likened to a "volcano", is a cause for health and quality of life concerns among locals, yet the fires have also been identified as a means by which excessive buildup of garbage has been averted. Both non-Romani and Romani workers on Kalymnos, especially younger persons, increasingly rely on waste scavenging and recycling as a means to survive. According to legally employed scrap recycler Giannis Velis, who is ethnic Romani, people from the local community, both Romani and non-Romani, set fire to the garbage in order to ensure the waste does not build up.

=== Spata Romani settlement ===
In 2000, a Romani settlement near Spata was temporarily relocated by local government authorities to a location situated on an isolated hilltop five kilometres from the town. The site is only accessible by a rough track. Shortages of water, no garbage collection services, poor water quality, inadequate sewerage, and outbreaks of hepatitis A have been reported at the settlement. As of 2009, the settlement had not been relocated. There have been unverified reports that the location is potentially contaminated with toxic waste, as it may have been the site of toxic waste dumping prior to settlement.

=== Alan Koyou Romani settlement ===
As of 2009, 1,700 people inhabited a Romani shantytown settlement in the Alan Koyou area of central Komotini. The community, which was surrounded by piles of garbage, was only serviced with two water taps, and experienced a hepatitis A outbreak in 2007 which resulted in the hospitalization of 60 children. Efforts to relocate the community to a site with healthier conditions in Kikidi have encountered opposition from residents there.

=== Aspropyrgos ===
Aspropyrgos, a municipality near Athens, is one of the largest industrial areas in Greece, containing hundreds of factories, warehouses, and other industrial facilities including an oil refinery which caught fire in 2015, severely injuring six workers. One environmentally problematic site was the Aspropyrgos Romani settlement, which was located on a garbage dump in an industrial sector of the community. Between July 2000 and February 2001, homes of Greek and Albanian Romani were demolished to ostensibly make way for potential Olympic developments, even though the area had been turned down for development by the International Olympic Committee in 1999. The destruction of the community was referred to by municipal authorities as a "cleaning operation".

On July 7, 2015, a major fire occurred at a private scrap metal warehouse nearby. Shortly after the blaze came under control by firefighters, groups of Romani persons entered the still-burning structure to scavenge for scrap metal. According to news reports, those entering the fire scene to collect scrap were "jeopardizing their lives" and in danger of sustaining burns and respiratory problems. Police had to be called to the scene to prevent Romani scrap collectors from entering the fire zone until firefighters could fully extinguish the blaze.

=== Nea Alikarnassos ===
In the municipality of Nea Alikarnassos, efforts to relocate a Romani settlement to make way for Olympic developments were halted by the Magistrate's Court of Heraklion, which ruled twice, in 2000 and 2001 respectively, that the relocation plans were "abusive", and that relocations could only take place under the condition that the new settlement location be provided with adequate housing and infrastructure to ensure a decent standard of living for its inhabitants. As of 2009, the settlement continued to occupy the area it had been situated for twenty years, between an industrial area and a major roadway. As of 2009, the settlement did not have electricity, sewerage, garbage collection, or clean water infrastructure.

=== Lechaina ===
In one instance, tree-planting has been documented as a proposed means to conceal the presence of Romani settlements during the lead-up to the Olympics. In Lechaina, Western Peloponnese, plans to relocate 35 Romani families next to the highway between Patras and Pyrgos (which is also the primary highway to Ancient Olympia) were abruptly placed on hold as a result of direct intervention from the Director of the Town Planning and Environment Directorate of the Western Greece Region. In the words of Alexandridis,

The Director informed Mr. [Dmitris] Hadjigiannis [the mayor of Lechaina] that because the suggested plot of land was within visual range of the national highway, the settlement's establishment should not go ahead as foreign visitors on their way to Olympia should not see the Gypsies living there. Mr. Hadjigiannis, thinking that this was a joke, called the Ministry of Interior, where the official with whom he spoke not only agreed with the rational [sic] of the Director of the Town Planning Directorate but also suggested that an alternative could be the appropriate landscaping of the settlement so that a small hill be created between the settlement and the national highway, upon which trees could be planted so that no visual contact between the settlement and drivers on the national highway could be established.

As of 2009, the resettlement had not taken place.

=== Migrant agricultural workers ===
Ethnic Pakistani and Bangladeshi agricultural workers in Greece have been subjected to well-documented cases of marginalization and violence within an environmental context, producing food and economic revenue for the Greek economy while themselves facing precarious living conditions and workplace environmental hazards, such as extremely harsh temperatures inside greenhouses. On the Peloponnese, thousands of undocumented ethnic Bangladeshi workers work harvesting potatoes and strawberries for extremely low-subsistence wages, often finding themselves working "under conditions akin to modern-day slavery", according to a report by Deutsche Welle.

In 2013, 28 workers on a strawberry farm in Nea Manolada (Manolada) were shot and wounded for demanding six months of unpaid wages. Approximately 200 workers were owed nearly 150,000 Euros, according to seasonal worker Liton Khan. In the words of Khan at the time, "We want our money, and we want justice. In the summer we slave away in greenhouses at temperatures up to sixty degrees Celsius."

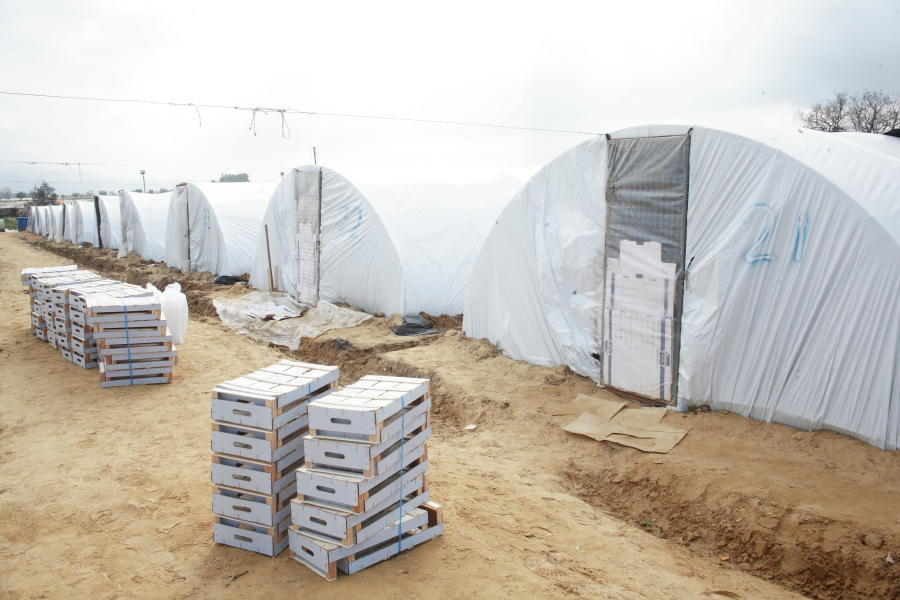
Strawberry greenhouses in Ilia

In court, the owner of the farm, Nikos Vaggelatos, and the head foreman were acquitted, while two other men were convicted of aggravated assault. The two convicted were initially sentenced to fourteen years seven months, and eight years seven months, respectively, however they were later released on appeal. The ruling sparked widespread outrage among anti-racist and immigrant-rights supporters and activists; in the words of far-left Syriza Party MP Vassiliki Katrivanou, "[the ruling] sends the message that a foreign worker can die like a dog in the orchard".

In Nea Manolada, hundreds of South Asian workers have settled into informal agricultural settlements under severely substandard living conditions. Due to the Greek economic crisis, the migrants have arguably become increasingly important to the economy, performing vital agricultural jobs that are generally not performed by Greek citizens, many of whom face unemployment. Bangladeshi workers near Nea Manolada live in camps made of plastic and other scavenged materials, lacking water, sanitation, and adequate cooking facilities. In the words of a migrant worker and camp-dweller named Doulak, "We can't go back to Bangladesh, we don't have enough food or work there. Here at least we have enough to survive."

Ejaz Ahmed, a translator working with Doctors Without Borders (MSF), has stated that migrant agricultural workers in Nea Manolada are reportedly faced with many restrictions to freedom of movement, such as not being allowed to sit in the town square, being barred from cafes, not being permitted to go swimming at nearby beaches, and denied the option of renting houses. Ejaz further added that workers are reportedly forced to live inside "chicken coops, warehouses, and derelict buildings".

On July 1, 2014, the Pakistani Community of Greece, the Immigrant Workers League and the United Movement Against Racism and the Fascist Threat (KEERFA) held a press conference regarding alleged working conditions. Migrant agricultural workers publicly shared their experiences with workplace or work-related violence and the non-payment of wages.

In 2014, Nabil-Iosaf Morad, a medical doctor born in Syria, became the first immigrant to be elected mayor in Greece, for the district seat of Lechaina, municipality of Andravida-Kallyni. According to journalist Kostantinos Menzel, Morad's election was politically significant because the municipality of Andravida-Kallyni encompasses Nea Manolada, where the 2013 shooting of migrant workers took place. Morad has stated of undocumented immigrants in the district:

I will take care of these people. One of my first official acts will be to set up a counselling center in the town hall for migrants. I expect support from the Bangladeshi embassy. They can bring their complaints and problems to this office. We also want to offer language courses. Their living conditions have to improve.

As of 2016, Morad has been the current mayor of the municipality of Andravida-Kallyni.

Migrant agricultural workers of predominantly Pakistani origin held a nearly week-long strike beginning July 3, 2014, in Skala, Peloponnese. The 800 workers participating in the strike were protesting "many delays in payment, inhumane living conditions and racist treatment by the Greek Police" according to Kalmouki. Local media reported that the immigrants marched from Skala's city hall to the police station, where they met with police officials and indicated an intention to press charges in relation to allegations of police abuses. This was the second protest by Pakistani agricultural workers in the area, who also held a strike in September 2010.

In spite of local efforts to improve conditions for agricultural migrant workers and refugees, issues persist due to their undocumented status and lack of formal immigration paperwork, which can only be assigned by the Greek government. According to Doulak, migrants are subjected to regular police harassment due to a lack of documents granting legal status in Greece. According to Doulak, "The main problem is that we have no papers. We get picked up by the police all the time. And the farmers think that they don't have to pay us, because we're here illegally, we have to live with no electricity or running water."

== Sweden ==
According to the report "Inconvenient Human Rights: Access to Water and Sanitation in Sweden's Informal Settlements", the Swedish state has, through international law, arguably aligned itself toward a legal responsibility of ensuring clean water access for all persons on Swedish territory. In the words of the report, "European and international human rights norms have legal significance in Swedish domestic law. Sweden has signed and ratified the International Covenant on Economic, Social and Cultural Rights, and the International Covenant on Civil and Political Rights, which articulates the rights to life and human dignity."

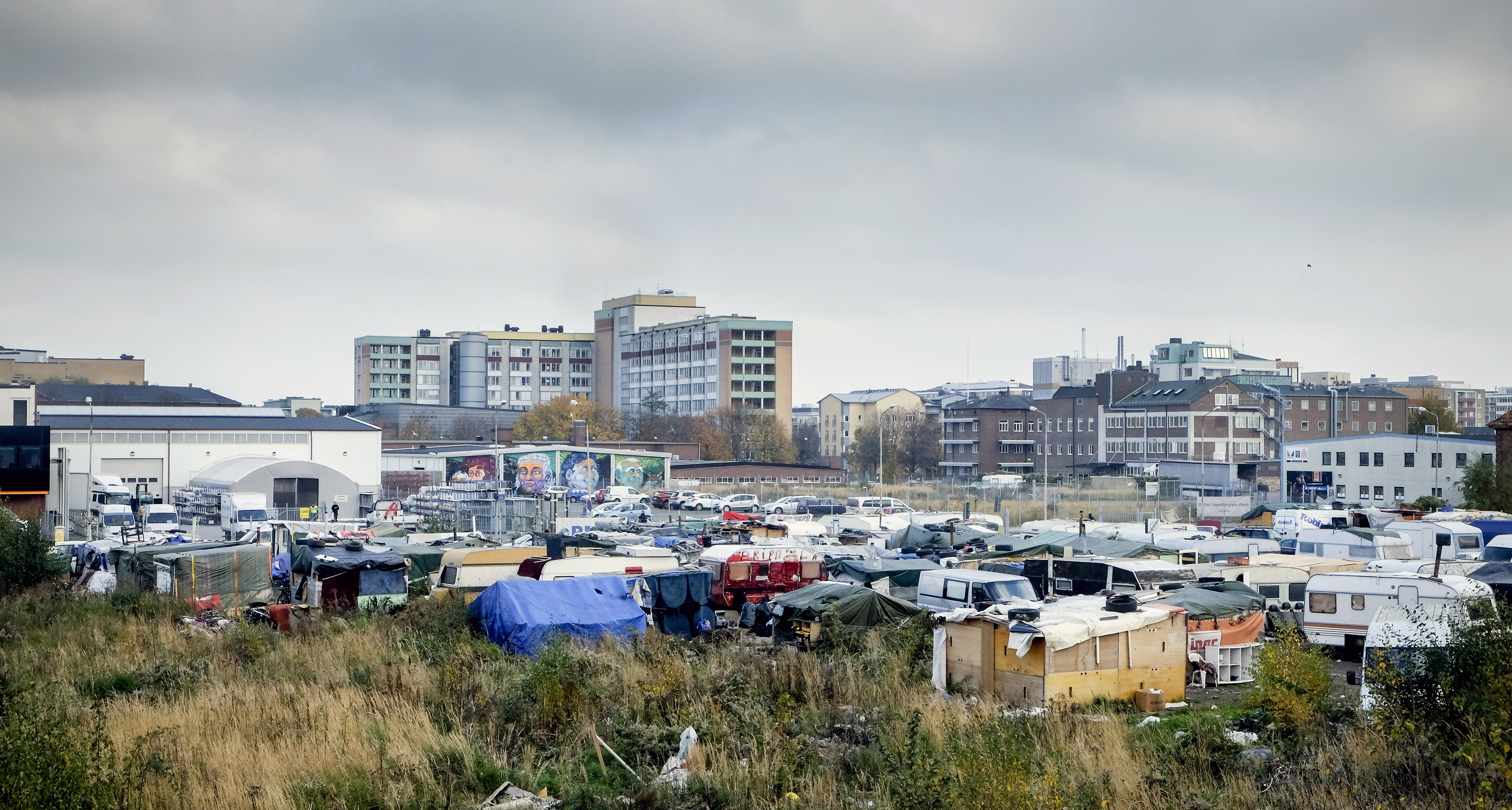
EU Migrant-Romani camp, Malmö. Lacking water, electricity, and sanitation, camps such as the one depicted are frequently evicted on environmental grounds.

While Sweden has a dualist legal system that does not automatically apply international law with domestic policy, "Sweden has embraced the task of integrating its human rights treaty obligations into Swedish law, principally through amending domestic law – a process called 'transformation.'" As a result, Swedish authorities are arguably increasingly legally responsible for upholding international human rights standards domestically, including the right to water. In the opinion of Davis and Ryan, lead authors of the report, "International bodies and human rights experts have repeatedly clarified that these rights extend to informal residents as well as formal settlements."

Sweden faces persistent issues regarding non-provision of environmental means of sustenance to persons who have recently arrived from Eastern Europe. These inhabitants, who are predominantly Romani, are EU citizens who have come to Sweden legally. Their experiences with denial of water access can arguably be viewed as part of a larger historical precedent of water, sanitation, and energy resource exclusion policy towards Romani persons in Sweden.

In the opinion of Davis and Ryan, "Water and sanitation access for vulnerable EU citizens in Sweden cannot be accurately understood without the backdrop of historic discrimination against Roma populations." As detailed by a 2014 Swedish Government report titled "The Dark Unknown History" examining Swedish state abuses toward the Romani minority, exclusion encompassed "invasive and degrading registration processes, forced sterilization, separation of families, limited and difficult access to housing, education and work, and bans on entering the country". According to Davis and Ryan,

Key players in this discrimination have been the Swedish government, the Church of Sweden, the National Board of Health and Welfare and the police. Over many decades, a major political justification for the control of Roma life was the need to rehabilitate the Roma. The White Paper reports that Roma were characterized as needing to be 'rescued from their inferior way of life and be brought within the framework of social care.' Another major justification for discriminatory practices was the widespread belief that Roma's situation is 'self-inflicted' or 'self-chosen.' Roma's 'nomadic way of life' provided an additional rationale for the refusal to include Roma in the national census, while their 'poor circumstances, meagre housing conditions' and children being taken into care, justified sterilization ... The White Paper concludes that Roma in Sweden in the 20th century and still currently, remain 'subjected to anti-Gypsyism.'

In Stockholm, Romani settlement was discouraged by authorities during the 1940s when increased numbers of Romani persons began to arrive, by denying access to water and electricity. In the 1950s, a pilot social program was initiated in Stockholm to provide Romani families with housing; however, the poor quality of the housing, exacerbated by a lack of hot water and central heating for 22 out of the sixty families involved, resulted in the program being "deemed a failure". In Gothenburg, similar issues have been documented, with interview testimony from Romani resident Sonya Taikon detailing how homeless Romani people in the 1960s had to live without electricity or sanitation, deriving their water "from a stream in the middle of Gothenburg".Davis and Ryan argue that these issues are policy-oriented in nature, stating:

water and sanitation access are central components of discrimination against Roma over the decades. As travelers in the early decades of the twentieth century seeking work, Roma communities necessarily looked for camping places where water and sanitation would be available. And when Swedish municipalities sought to deter Roma groups from settling, controlling their access to water and sanitation is often a means to that end.

Contrary to stereotypes that portray Romani marginalization as "self-chosen", historical documentation exists of Swedish Romani individuals describing their close affinity with water resources, and of their efforts to gain access to water resources. As described through an oral account from an ethnographic study, one Romani woman

recalled that in the 1920s, when the family was able to stay long enough in one place, her mechanically-minded father had the know-how to build devices for daily hygiene and washing of clothes. At one point, her father built a square wash basin and toilet. He covered the floor with fir twigs, then cartons and finally rugs so the family would not get cold feet. 'It was so exciting, you never forget,' the woman remembered.

In the same study, Romani persons interviewed "described the efforts they made to ensure that they did not disturb Swedish residents so that they could continue to access water. One interviewee recalled that her mother bound the dogs' muzzles to keep them from barking and jeopardizing their permission to obtain water from a local farm."

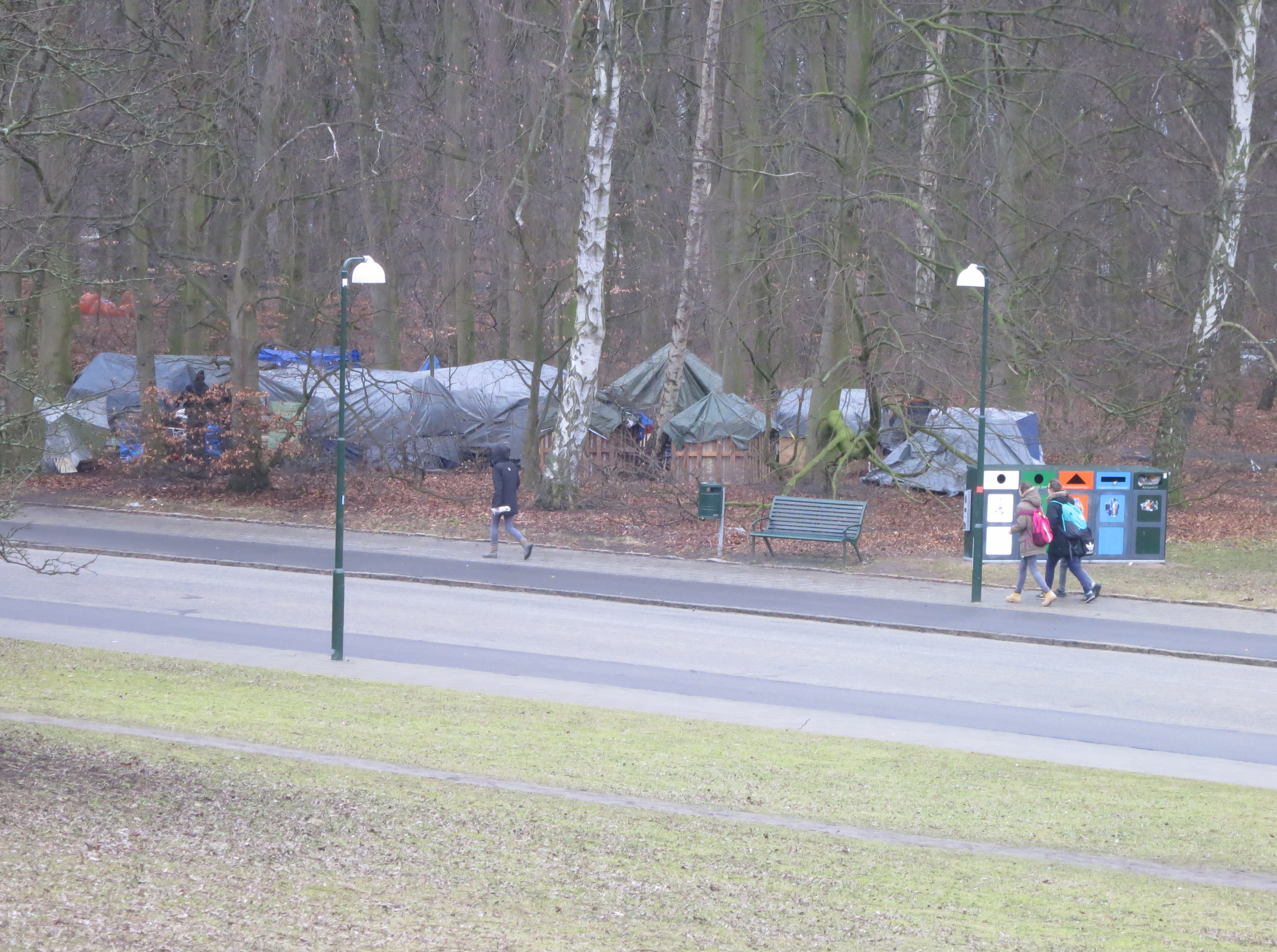
EU Migrant-Romani camp, Malmö, 2015

Between January 2013 and January 2016, "83 evictions of groups of vulnerable EU citizens holding a right of residence in Romania or Bulgaria" took place. Of the applications for these evictions, "an overwhelming number cite the prevalence of, or risk for, sanitation hazards and littering as grounds for eviction" and are understood within a context of environmental impact concern in which the lack of access to water is cited as a central issue. Locations of evictions where water and sanitation access has been cited as reason for eviction have been tracked through an interactive mapping database developed in collaboration between Södertörn and Northeastern Universities respectively. Most of these cases have occurred in the greater Stockholm and Gothenburg regions respectively, along with cases in Uddevalla, Malmö, Skara, Karlstad, and Uppsala.

One notable example of water exclusion can be found in northern regions of Sweden, where Romani EU citizens from Eastern Europe come to work as farm laborers in the berry harvesting industry. In one case, living out of informal camps, these workers have described having to travel distances up to 60 kilometres (round trip) to acquire water; using water from gas stations; and constructing makeshift latrines. Conflicts with local residents surrounding water use were alleviated as a result of the local municipality installing water cisterns for the farm workers.

In many cases, the risk or threat of significant environmental impact is invoked as a reason for eviction, even when very small numbers of individuals are involved and the actual environmental impact may arguably be minimal. In the words of Davis and Ryan:

sanitation hazards are viewed as equally severe regardless of the number of identified respondents to whom the eviction decision is directed, whether it be two or several dozen ... Twenty five of the eviction decisions were directed at six respondents or fewer and had existed anywhere from ten days up to three months. Despite these settlements being significantly smaller than many of the others and not having existed very long, "extensive inconveniences" in terms of sanitation costs were still cited in each decision. This was the case in a 2013 decision in Stockholm, where the municipality held that "the area around the settlement is subjected to great environmental impacts ... The decision only concerned two respondents".

Alongside a similar case from Gothenburg in 2014, Davis and Ryan further highlight a case in Stockholm from 2015 where two persons were legally deemed by the Stockholm Land and Premises Maintenance Office to carry the same burden of environmental impact as the settlement they took up residence, which already had 49 inhabitants. Cases have also been recorded where assumptions of environmental damage and pollution were made, even though evidence to suggest otherwise was documented. Private businesses and individuals, who often provide water and sanitation services out of goodwill, often bear a disproportionate burden of pressures caused by these issues. In the opinion of Davis and Ryan, denial of water access to certain individuals can arguably impact the rights of all members of a community:

without access to on-site or nearby sanitation, and without local government support in accessing these necessities the informal camps where vulnerable EU citizens often reside can soon raise legitimate public health and environmental concerns, impinging on the rights of all in the community, creating a crisis for the municipality and incurring even greater city expenses in evictions and site clean-ups.

Despite Sweden's multiple legal commitments to international and domestic human rights, issues of environmental inequality, in the form of water, sanitation, and electricity access, arguably persist as a continuation of historical patterns of inequality affecting its Romani minority. These issues exist in modern-day parallel with Swedish practices of racism and environmental marginalization toward the Sami Indigenous people and their territories.

== See also ==
- Environmental racism in Europe
