= Association for Juridical Studies on Immigration =

The Association for Juridical Studies on Immigration (ASGI from its original Italian title, Associazione per gli Studi Giuridici sull'Immigrazione) is an Italian-originated membership-based association which addresses all legal aspects of immigration. The association does this both at national and European levels, in the contexts of numerous aspects of immigration and migrants' rights. These include the fields of antidiscrimination and xenophobia, children’s and unaccompanied minors' rights, asylum and refugee seekers, statelessness and citizenship. It was founded in 1990.

ASGI has ongoing projects within Italy:

- OUT OF LIMBO: a campaign to promote the right of undocumented and stateless Roma migrants to have a legal status in Italy.
- Terragiusta: a campaign against the exploitation of migrant workers in agriculture in Italy.
- In Limine: a project led by ASGI to address issues relating to border control and access to international protection.

During 2026, ASGI provided legal advice to the NGO operating the refugee rescue vessel Louise Michel in relation to the case brought by the Italian state alleging that the boat had had plenty of fuel to travel to a more distant port than the one chosen for disembarkation.
