= Glory & Honor =

1998 American TV film

- VHS cover
- Genre: Docudrama
- Screenplay by: Jeff Lewis; Susan Rhinehart
- Story by: Robert Caputo
- Directed by: Kevin Hooks
- Starring: Delroy Lindo; Henry Czerny
- Music by: Bruce Broughton
- Country of origin: United States
- Original language: English

Production
- Executive producer: Bruce Gilbert
- Producers: Ralph Kendall Berge; Lynn Raynor
- Cinematography: Douglas Milsome
- Editor: Karen Stern
- Running time: 95 minutes
- Production company: American Filmworks

Original release
- Network: TNT
- Release: March 1, 1998

Glory & Honor is a 1998 American docudrama television film directed by Kevin Hooks and written by Jeff Lewis and Susan Rhinehart, from a story by Robert Caputo. The film is based on the true story of Robert Peary (Henry Czerny) and Matthew Henson's (Delroy Lindo) 1909 journey to the Geographic North Pole, and their nearly 20-year history of exploring the Arctic together. It aired on TNT on March 1, 1998.

== Cast ==
- Delroy Lindo as Matthew Henson
- Henry Czerny as Robert Peary
- Bronwen Booth as Josephine Diebitsch Peary
- Kim Staunton as Lucy Ross Henson
- David Ferry as John Verhoeff
- Richard Fitzpatrick as Dr. Draper
- John Novak as Langdon Gibson

== Production ==
Filming took place on Baffin Island and in Montreal, Canada.

== Awards ==
Year	Group	Award	Nominee	Result
1998	Satellite Award	Best Actor – Miniseries or Television Film	Delroy Lindo	Won
1998	Primetime Emmy Award	Outstanding Music Composition for a Miniseries or a Movie (Dramatic Underscore)	Bruce Broughton	Won
