= Cheyenne Haynes =

American actress, dancer, singer, and model

- Born: Cheyenne Renee Haynes; Los Angeles, California, U.S.
- Occupations: Actress; dancer; model; singer

Cheyenne Renee Haynes is an American actress, dancer, singer, and model. Her notable works include the Lifetime Movie Network television film Lies in Plain Sight, I Know My Kid's a Star, HBO's Camping, and CW's The Lost Boys.

== Early life ==
Cheyenne was born in Los Angeles, California, in the neighborhood of Silverlake and raised by her mother, Helene Kress. Cheyenne followed the family line as her mother and father were both musicians and performers. Helene was a singer and actress. Her father, Scott Haynes, was a self-taught multi-instrumentalist and singer. Kress and Haynes were never married.

== Career ==
=== Acting ===
Haynes booked her first job as a model at the age of two for the movie Baby Geniuses. She also booked her first commercial at the same age. Haynes worked on various commercials, print ads, TV Shows & Films until her first major breakthrough in the industry when she landed a spot on the reality TV show, Danny Bonaduce's I Know My Kid's a Star. Haynes booked her spot with a single audition and was beloved by viewers during the course of the show, eventually placing as the runner-up. She gained critical acclaim for her next major role as Eva in the Lifetime Movie Network's Lies in Plain Sight, with her mother being portrayed by Rosie Pérez.

== Filmography ==
Film
Year	Film	Role	Notes
2002	The Time Machine	Young Eloi	
2006	Material Girls	Inez's Daughter No. 1	
2017	Don't Come Back from the Moon	Jodie	
2018	Under the Silver Lake	Bathroom Girl No. 2	
2020	There Will Always Be Christmas	Tasha	
2022	Student Body	Merritt Sinclair	
	Graveyard Spiral	Girl	
Television
Year	Title	Role	Notes
2002	Oh Baby	Sara	Columbia Tristar
2002	The X-Files	Courtney Wells	Fox
2002	Boston Public	Juan's Sister	Episode 1.04: "Chapter Four"
2002	MADtv	Christmas Caroler	Episode 8.10
2004	Scrubs	Daughter	Episode 3.20: "My Fault"
2006	Windfall	Isabel	Episode 1.03: "There and Gone Again"
2008	Kath & Kim	Shanelle	Episode 1.01: "Pilot"
2009	Everybody Hates Chris	Caramel	Episode 4.12: "Everybody Hates Varsity Jackets"
2010	Summer Camp	Charisse	Nickelodeon – Made-for-television movie
2010	Lies in Plain Sight	Eva	Made-for-television movie
2011	Body of Proof	Maya Gleason	Episode 2.10: "You're Number's Up"
2012	House	Jordan	Episode 8.11: "Nobody's Fault"
2012	Melissa & Joey	Stella	Episode 2.2: "If You Can't Stand The Heat"
2013	Disney's Explored	Host	Disney – Host: "All Episodes"
2013	Yellow Ribbon	Sarah Rutty	ABC Family short
2014	Love and Salsa	self	Nevo TV – Self
2014	Awkward	Girl in Crowd	MTV
2014	Discord and Harmony	Wendy	TV pilot
2015	Celebrity Name Game	Contestant	Episode 106: Coquette Productions
2016	Casual	Alicia	Hulu
2016	The Real O'Neals	Girl No. 3	ABC
2016	Free Period	Carolina	Disney
2016	Shameless	Bethany	Showtime
2016	Good Girls Revolt	Novo	Amazon "2 Episodes"
2017	MacGyver	Vanessa Frank	CBS
2017	Grey's Anatomy	Mindy (Intern)	ABC "2 Episodes"
2017	The Get	Cheyenne	CBS pilot
2017	Adam Ruins Everything	Hot Model/Speed Dater 1	Tru TV
2018	Camping	Sol	HBO "All Episodes"
2018	Just Add Magic	Young Noelle	Amazon "5 Episodes"
2018	SWAT	Lainey	CBS
2019	The Lost Boys	Liza Frog	Warner Brothers
2019	Veronica Mars	Tess	Rob Thomas Productions
2019	The Baxters	Ruth	MGM
2021	SEAL Team	Young Lisa Davis	CBS
Reality television
Year	Title	Role	Notes
2008	I Know My Kid's a Star	Contestant	Runner-up
2008	Dancing with the Stars	Dancer / Herself	Episode 7.21: "Round 10: Results"
2009	BrainSurge	Contestant	Nickelodeon game show
2010	Disney Channel's 3 Minute Game Show	Herself	Episode: "Camp Rock 2: Part 3"

=== Video ===
- Fragile Tension / Hole to Feed ... Lead Singer
- Bill Nye – Electricity ... Lead Singer/Dancer/Voice Over
- 8 Days Of Christmas ... Beyoncé's Friend
- The La La Song ... Pom Pom Girl
- Good Love ... Flower Girl
- All I Want Is Happiness ... Girl in Park
- Blow ... Female Bruno Mars

Chris Brown …. Back to Sleep

=== Theatre ===
- Standing on the Shoulders Of Giants ... Maxine
- The American Girls Revue ... Keisha/Addy
- Pepito's Story ... Beach Girl (Dancer)
- Chaka Khan Benefit ... Singer/Dancer
- World Literacy Crusade ... Dancer
- Spirit of Play ... Singer/Dancer
- Make Mine 369 ... Star
