= Jan Adams (surgeon) =

American former plastic surgeon (born 1954)

- Born: Rudalgo Alonzo Adams; April 21, 1954 (age 72); Middletown, Ohio, U.S.
- Education: Harvard University; Ohio State University College of Medicine
- Occupations: Cosmetic surgeon; author; television presenter

Jan Rudalgo Adams (born Rudalgo Alonzo Adams; April 21, 1954) is an American former cosmetic surgeon, author, and television presenter. Adams is most known for operating on Donda West, mother of Kanye West, a day before her death. He gave up his surgeon’s license in California in 2009.

== Early life ==
Rudalgo Alonzo Adams was born in Middletown, Ohio. At six months, his name was changed to Jan Rudalgo Adams. He attended Harvard University. After his sophomore year, Adams worked for S. Allen Counter where he studied the hearing systems of insects. He attended Harvard starting in March 1977 and graduated from Ohio State University College of Medicine in June 1985. He trained in plastic and reconstructive surgery at the University of Michigan where he served as chief resident in plastic surgery. He completed his surgical training as UCLA's first fellow in aesthetic surgery.

== Career ==
Adams began his career as an author with scientific journals: the first was "Late Infection Following Aesthetic Malar Augmentation with Proplast Implants" with Dr. Henry Kawamoto. Adams's first book, Everything Women of Color Should Know About Cosmetic Surgery, was published by St Martin's Press in 2000.

His break in television came in 2001 when he was chosen as a correspondent for syndicated entertainment show Extra. He also starred on daytime talk show The Other Half with Dick Clark, Danny Bonaduce and Mario Lopez. He has appeared on Plastic Surgery: Before & After and The Oprah Winfrey Show.

== Later career ==
Adams was the plastic surgeon who performed breast reduction surgery, along with other procedures, on Donda West, the mother of rapper Kanye West. Donda West died at home the next day, November 10, 2007, while under the care of her nephew, a nurse. The final coroner's report January 10, 2008 said Donda West died of "coronary artery disease and multiple post-operative factors due to or as a consequence of liposuction and mammoplasty." Records also indicate that in 2001, two malpractice lawsuits against Adams ended in judgments of $217,337 and $250,000.

On November 20, 2007, Adams walked off the television show Larry King Live, telling host Larry King he did not wish to answer any questions regarding West's death, citing a request by the West family for privacy. He returned to the show on January 22, 2008, stating he was there to "defend himself" rather than discuss the specifics of West's death. He claimed his business had been "almost destroyed" by the publicity surrounding the case, and he took responsibility for multiple DUI offenses.

On June 26, 2008, Adams was arrested again for driving under the influence of alcohol and for driving without a license in Solano County, California. He pleaded no contest to one misdemeanor count of driving under the influence on January 7, 2009, and was sentenced to one year in jail. On April 8, 2009, Adams surrendered his California medical license following his multiple convictions for alcohol-related offenses. After an appeals process, Adams's license was reinstated under probationary restrictions on March 14, 2013. His license was revoked again on October 10, 2014, because he failed to comply with the terms of his probation.

In April 2018, Kanye West claimed the cover to his eighth studio album, Love Everyone, would be a picture of Adams. According to West, he wanted the message of the artwork to be to "forgive and stop hating", implying he had forgiven Adams for his mother's death. West ultimately did not follow through with this decision after Adams published an open letter asking West to stop using his image. West later scrapped the album entirely after his rant at the TMZ office, eventually releasing the fully reworked album Ye with a different cover.
