= Matthew Henson =

American explorer (1866–1955)

Matthew A. Henson
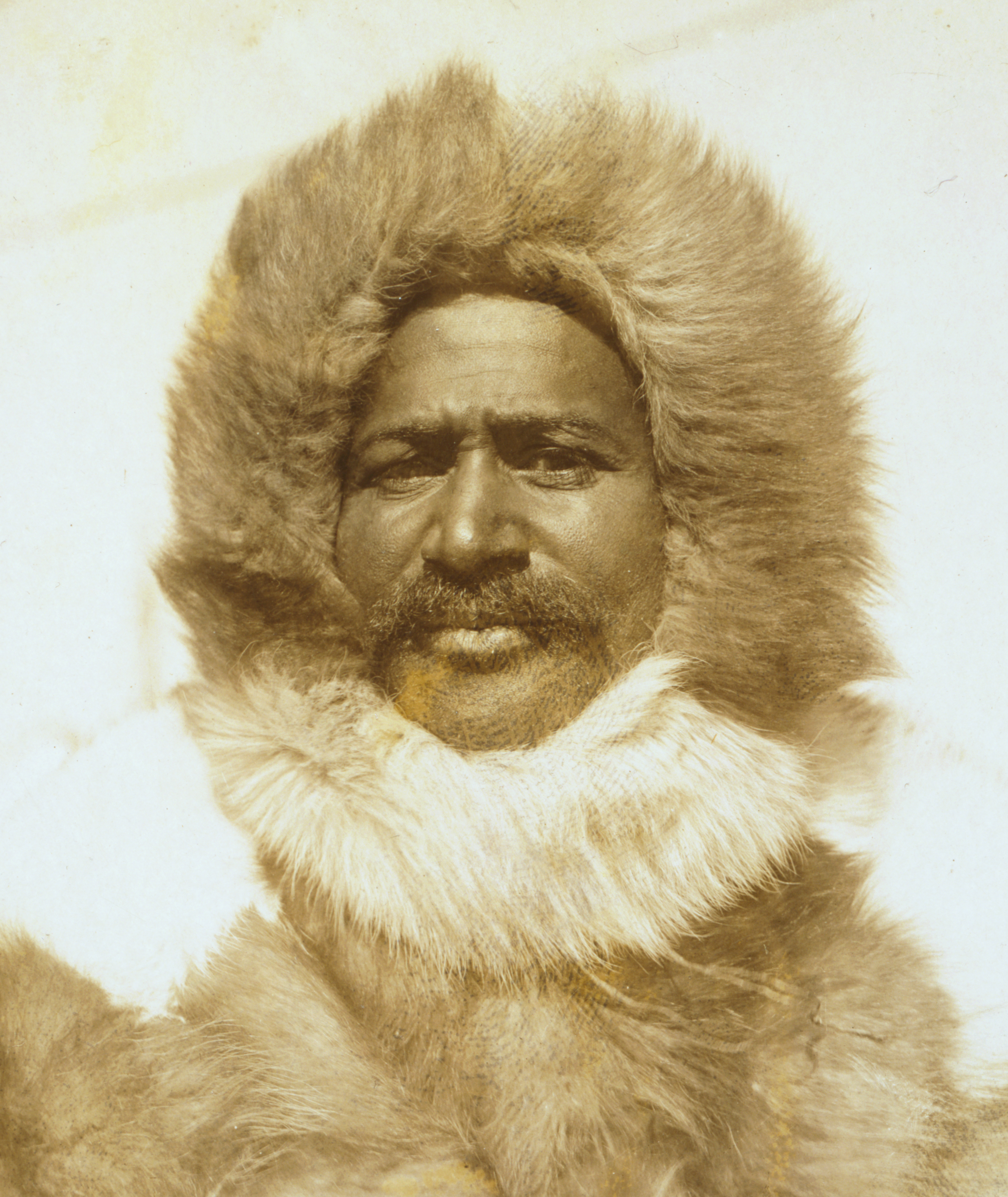
- Henson c. 1910
- Born: Matthew Alexander Henson; August 8, 1866; Nanjemoy, Maryland, U.S.
- Died: March 9, 1955 (aged 88); The Bronx, New York, US
- Resting place: Arlington National Cemetery
- Known for: Arctic explorer, claimed as the first to reach the geographic North Pole
- Spouses: Eva Flint (m. 1891–1897) Lucy Ross (m. 1907): Akatingwah (concubine)
- Children: Anauakaq (1906–1987; by Akatingwah)
- Awards: Peary Polar Expedition Medal; Hubbard Medal

Matthew Alexander Henson (August 8, 1866 – March 9, 1955) was an African-American explorer who accompanied Robert Peary on seven voyages to the Arctic over a period of nearly 23 years. They spent a total of 18 years on expeditions together. He is best known for his participation in the 1908–1909 expedition that claimed to have reached the geographic North Pole on April 6, 1909. Henson later said that he was the first of their party to reach the North Pole.

Henson was born in Nanjemoy, Maryland, to sharecropper parents who were free Black Americans before the Civil War. He spent most of his early life in Washington, D.C., but left school at the age of twelve to work as a cabin boy on a police sloop that patrolled the oyster fields of the Potomac River. He later worked as a salesclerk at a department store. One of his customers was Robert Peary, who in 1887 hired him as a personal valet. At the time, Peary was working on the Nicaragua Canal.

Their first Arctic expedition together was in 1891–92. Henson served as a navigator and craftsman, and was known as Peary's "first man". Like Peary, he studied Inuit survival techniques.

During their 1908–09 expedition to Greenland, Henson was one of the six men – including Peary and four Inuit assistants – who claimed to have been the first to reach the geographic North Pole. In interviews, Henson identified as the first member of the party to reach what they believed was the pole. The team's claim had gained widespread acceptance, but, in 1989, Wally Herbert published research that found that their expedition records were unreliable and indicated an implausibly high speed during their final rush for the pole, and that the men could have fallen 30–60 miles (48–97 km) short of the pole due to navigational errors.

Henson achieved a degree of fame as a result of participating in the expedition, and in 1912, he published a memoir titled A Negro Explorer at the North Pole. As he approached old age, his exploits received renewed attention. In 1937, he was the first African American to be made a life member of The Explorers Club; in 1948, he was elevated to the club's highest level of membership. In 1944, Henson was awarded the Peary Polar Expedition Medal, and he was received at the White House by Presidents Harry Truman and Dwight Eisenhower. In 1988, he and his wife were re-interred at Arlington National Cemetery. In 2000, Henson posthumously was awarded the Hubbard Medal by the National Geographic Society. In September 2021, the International Astronomical Union named a lunar crater after him.

== Early life and education ==
Henson was born on August 8, 1866, on his parents' farm east of the Potomac River in Charles County, Maryland, to sharecroppers who had been free people of color before the American Civil War. Matthew's parents were subjected to attacks by the Ku Klux Klan and other white supremacist groups, who terrorized southern freedmen and former free people of color after the Civil War.

To escape from racial violence in southern Maryland, the Henson family sold the farm in 1867 and moved to Georgetown, then still an independent town adjacent to the national capital. He had an older sister S., born in 1864, and two younger sisters Eliza and M. Matthew's mother died when Matthew was seven. His father Lemuel remarried to a woman named Caroline and had additional children with her, including daughters and a son.

After his father died, Matthew was sent to stay with his uncle, who lived in Washington, D.C. (Georgetown was made part of Washington, DC in 1871.) The uncle paid for a few years of education for Matthew but soon died. Henson attended a Black public school for the next six years, during the last of which he took a summer job washing dishes in a restaurant. His early years were marked by one especially memorable event. When he was 10 years old, he went to a ceremony honoring Abraham Lincoln, the American president who had fought so hard to preserve the Union during the Civil War and had issued the proclamation that had freed slaves in the occupied Confederate states in 1863. At the ceremony, Matthew was greatly inspired by a speech given by Frederick Douglass, an escaped slave and renowned orator, the long-time leading figure in the Black American community. Douglass called upon Black people to vigorously pursue educational opportunities and battle racial prejudice.

At the age of 12, the youth made his way to Baltimore, Maryland, a busy port. He went to sea as a cabin boy on the merchant ship Katie Hines, traveling to ports in China, Japan, Africa, and the Russian Arctic seas. The ship's leader, Captain Childs, took Henson under his wing and taught him to read and write.

== Exploration ==
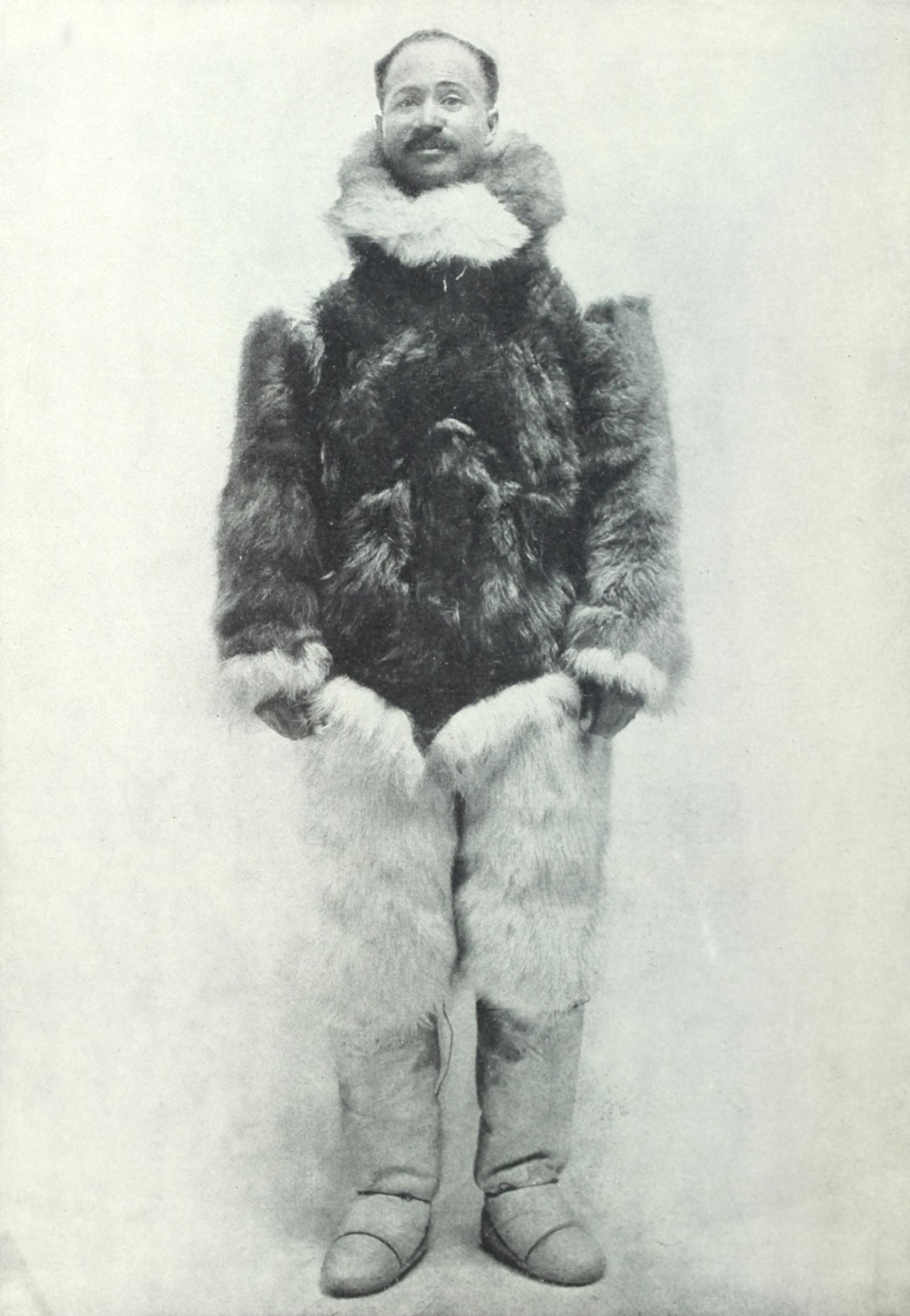
Henson in his Arctic furs

While working at a Washington D.C. clothing store, B.H. Stinemetz and Sons, in November 1887, Henson met Commander Robert E. Peary. Learning of Henson's sea experience, Peary recruited him as an aide for his planned voyage and surveying expedition to Nicaragua, with four other men. Peary supervised 45 engineers on the canal survey in Nicaragua. Impressed with Henson's seamanship on that voyage, Peary recruited him as a colleague and he became "first man" in his expeditions.

After that, for more than 20 years, their expeditions were to the Arctic. Henson traded with the Inuit and mastered the Inuit language; they called him Mahri-Pahluk. He was remembered as the only non-Inuit who became skilled in driving the dog sleds and in training dog teams in the Inuit way. He was a skilled craftsman, often coming up with solutions for what the team needed in the harsh Arctic conditions; they learned to build igloos out of snow, for mobile housing as they traveled. His and Peary's teams covered thousands of miles in dog sleds and reached the "Farthest North" point of any Arctic expedition until 1909.

=== 1908–09 expedition ===
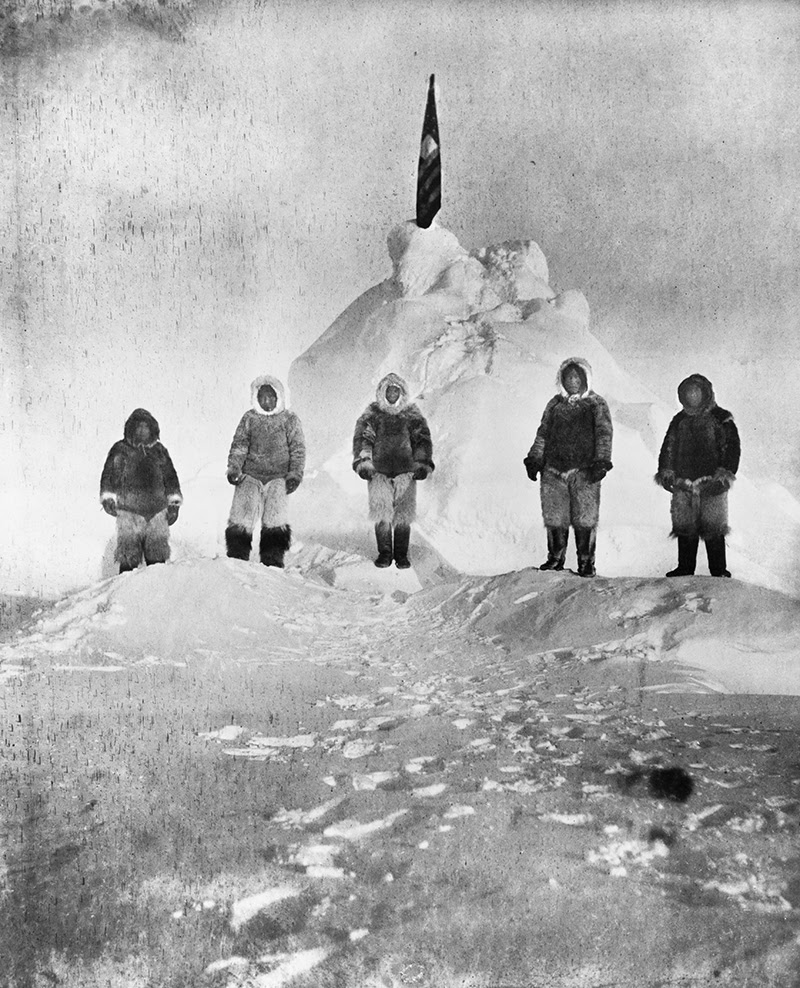
Photograph of Henson and the four Inuit guides on the last stretch of their 1908–09 expedition, taken by Peary at what they believed to be the North Pole.

In 1908–09, Peary mounted his eighth attempt to reach the North Pole. The expedition was large, as Peary planned to use his system of setting up cached supplies along the way. When he and Henson boarded his ship Roosevelt, leaving Greenland on August 18, 1909, they were accompanied by

22 Inuit men, 17 Inuit women, 10 children, 246 dogs, 70 tons (64 metric tons) of whale meat from Labrador, the meat and blubber of 50 walruses, hunting equipment, and tons of coal. In February, Henson and Peary departed their anchored ship at Ellesmere Island's Cape Sheridan, with the Inuit men and 130 dogs working to lay a trail and supplies along the route to the Pole.

Peary selected Henson and four Inuit as part of the team of six men who would make the final run to the Pole. Before the goal of reaching the North Pole was reached, Peary could no longer continue on foot and rode in a dog sled. Various accounts say he was ill, was exhausted, or had frozen toes. He sent Henson ahead as a scout.

In a newspaper interview, Henson later said:

I was in the lead that had overshot the mark a couple of miles. We went back then and I could see that my footprints were the first at the spot.

Henson then proceeded to plant the American flag.

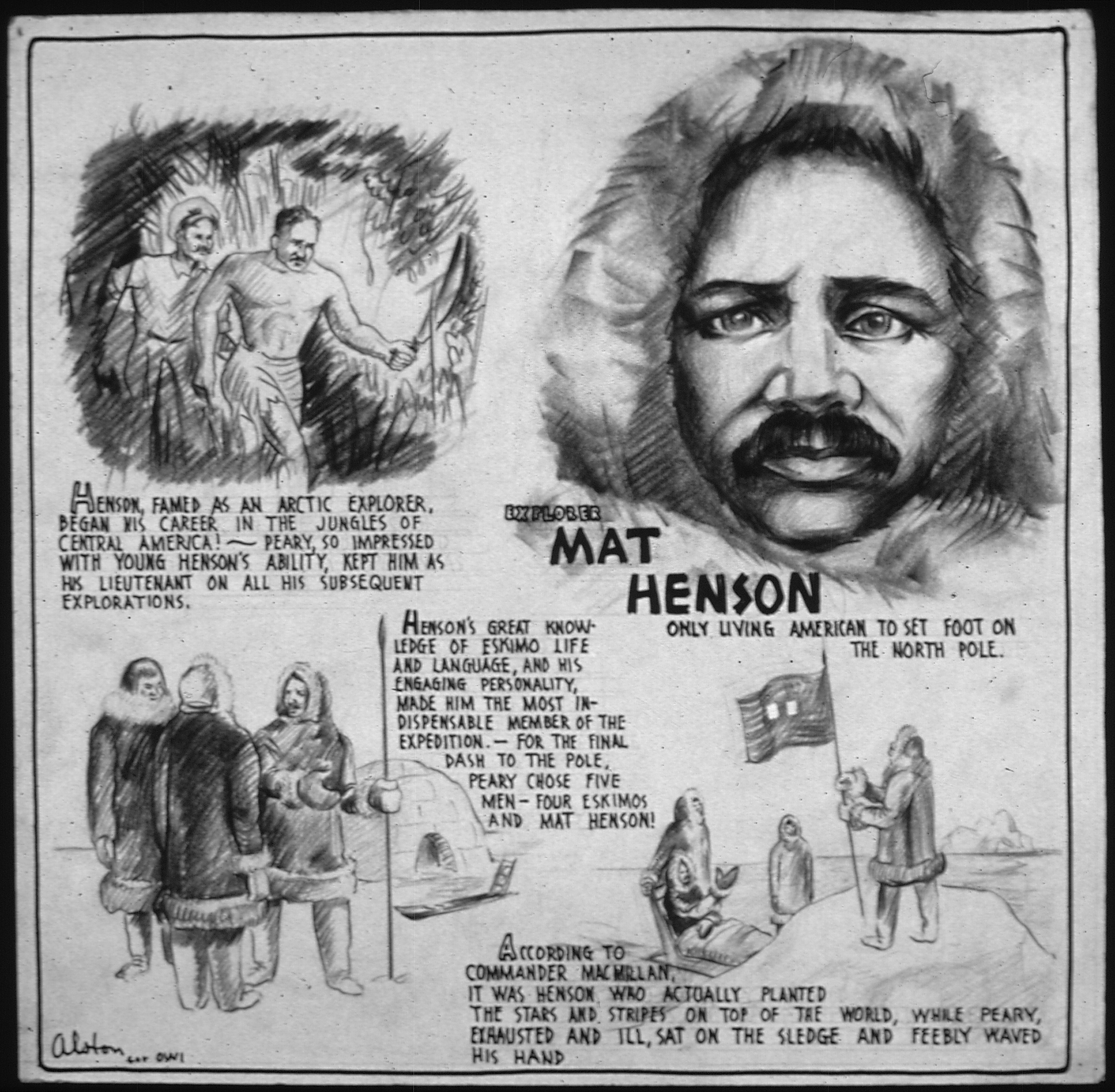
Illustration of Matthew Henson by Charles Alston

The claim by Peary's team to have reached the North Pole was widely debated in newspapers at the time, as was the competing claim by Frederick Cook. The National Geographic Society as well as the Naval Affairs Subcommittee of the U.S. House of Representatives both credited Peary's team with having reached the North Pole. Others remained doubtful. A reassessment of Peary's notebook by British polar explorer Wally Herbert in 1988 found it "lacking in essential data", thus, renewing doubts about Peary's claim.

== Later life ==
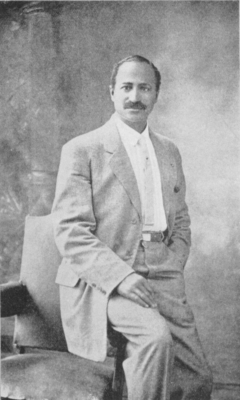
Photograph of Henson in civilian clothing, taken from his 1912 book A Negro Explorer at the North Pole

In 1912 Henson published a memoir about his arctic explorations, A Negro Explorer at the North Pole. In this, he describes himself as a "general assistant, skilled craftsperson, interpreter, and laborer." He later collaborated with author Bradley Robinson on his 1947 biography, Dark Companion, which told more about his life.

During the following decades, Admiral Peary received many honors for leading the expedition to the Pole, but Henson's contributions were largely ignored. In 1909 he was honored at dinners within the black community. Henson spent most of the next 30 years working on staff in the U.S. Customs House in New York, at the suggestion of Theodore Roosevelt.

He later gained renewed attention. In 1937, Henson was admitted as a member to the prestigious Explorers Club in New York City, and in 1948 he was made an honorary member, of whom there are only 20 per year. In 1944 Congress awarded him and five other Peary aides duplicates of the Peary Polar Expedition Medal, a silver medal given to Peary. Presidents Truman and Eisenhower both honored Henson before he died in 1955.

Henson died in the Bronx, New York, on March 9, 1955, at the age of 88. He was buried at Woodlawn Cemetery and survived by his wife Lucy. After her death in 1968, she was buried with him. In 1988, both their bodies were moved for reinterment at Arlington National Cemetery, accompanied by a commemoration ceremony.

== Family ==
Henson married Eva Flint in 1891, but their marriage did not survive their long periods of separation, and they divorced in 1897. He later married Lucy Ross in New York City on September 7, 1907. They had no children.

During the extended expeditions to Greenland, Henson and Peary both took Inuit women as "country wives" and fathered children with them. With his concubine, known as Akatingwah, Henson fathered his only child, a son named Anauakaq, born in 1906. Anauakaq's children are Henson's only descendants. After 1909, Henson never saw Akatingwah or his son again; other explorers sometimes updated him about them. The existence of Henson's and Peary's descendants first was made public by French explorer and ethnologist Jean Malaurie who spent a year in Greenland in 1951–1952.

S. Allen Counter, a neuroscientist and director of the Harvard Foundation, had been interested in Henson's story and traveled in Greenland for research related to it. Learning of possible descendants of the explorers, he tracked down Henson's and Peary's sons, Anauakaq and Kali, respectively in 1986. By then the men were octogenarians. He arranged a visit for them the following year to the United States, where they met American relatives from both families and visited their fathers' graves. Anauakaq died in 1987. He and his wife Aviaq had five sons and a daughter, who have children of their own. While some still reside in Greenland, others have moved to Sweden or the United States.

Several Inuit family members returned to Washington, D.C., in 1988 for the ceremony of reinterment of Henson and his wife Lucy at Arlington National Cemetery. Counter had petitioned President Ronald Reagan for this honor to gain recognition of Henson's contributions to Arctic exploration. Counter wrote a book about his finding Anauakaq and Kali, his research on Henson's life and contributions, historical racial relations, and the Inuits' meeting with Henson and Peary relatives in the United States, entitled North Pole Legacy: Black, White and Eskimo (1991). The material was adapted and produced as a film documentary by the same name.

=== Extended family ===
Matthew Henson's only descendants were the children of his Inuit son and their children. According to S. Allen Counter, in his lifetime Henson had identified families of two nieces as being part of his extended birth family. They were Virginia Carter Brannum, daughter of Henson's sister Eliza Henson Carter of Washington, D.C., and Olive Henson Fulton of Boston, daughter of his half-brother. In a 1988 article, Counter noted that these two women had letters and photographs certifying their kinship. They were the only family members to attend Henson's funeral in 1955, along with his widow Lucy Ross Henson. Counter later recommended to the United States Navy and the National Geographic Society that Audrey Mebane, daughter of Virginia Brannum, and Olive Henson Fulton be designated as family representatives for any ceremonies honoring Henson.

Henson is believed to be a great-great-granduncle of actress Taraji P. Henson.

== Legacy and honors ==
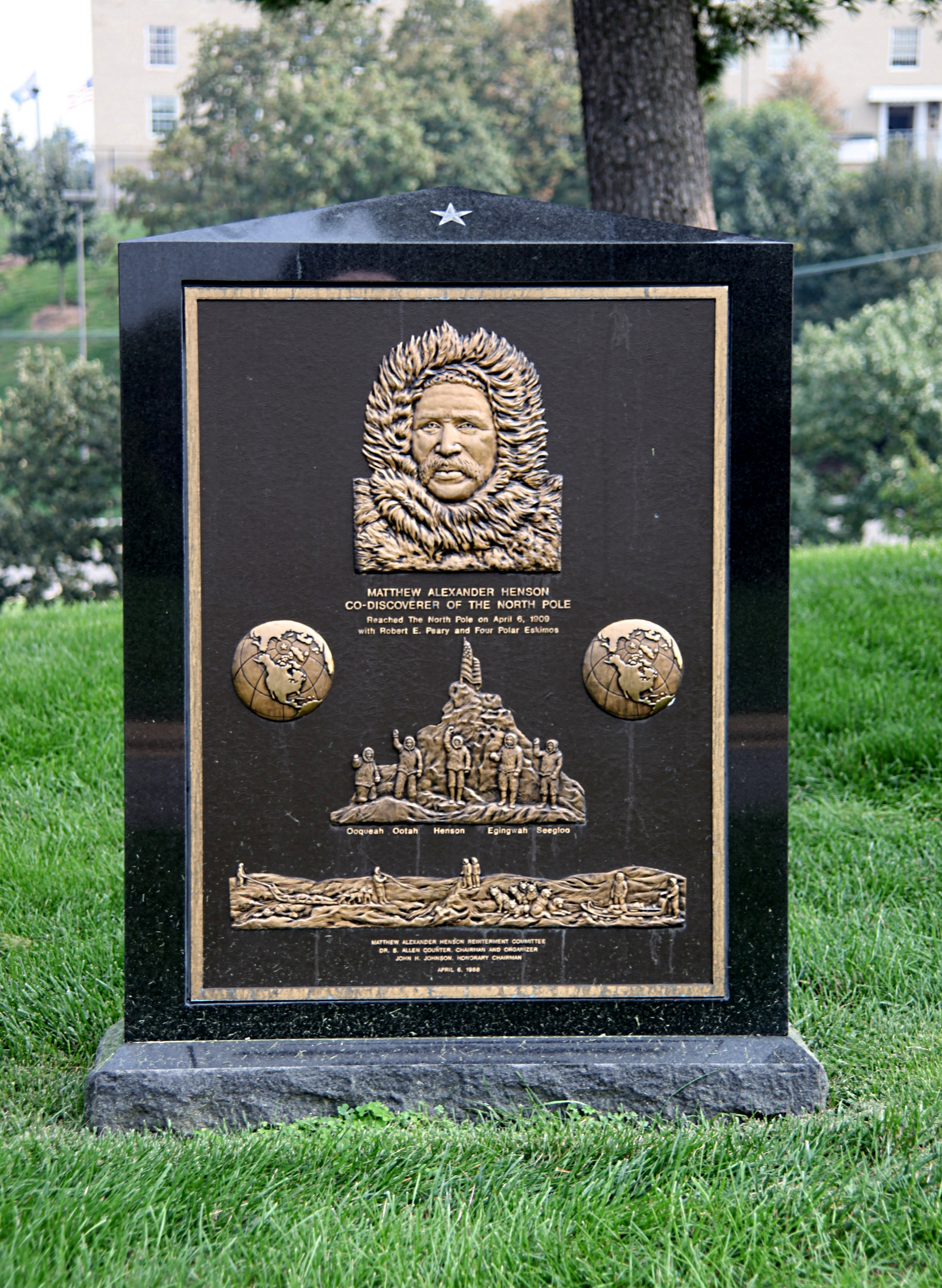
Henson's grave in Arlington National Cemetery in Arlington, Virginia, U.S.

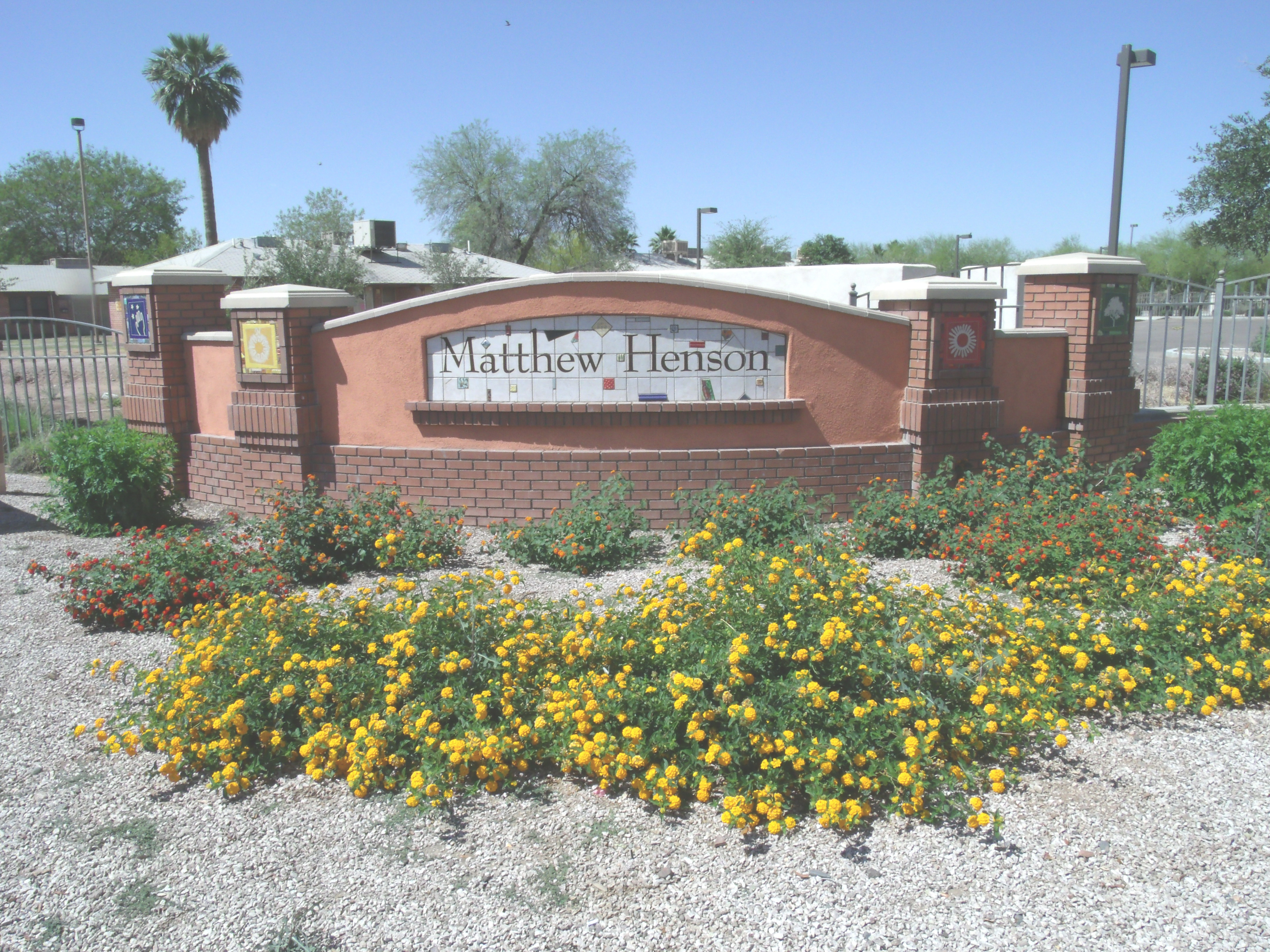
Entrance of the site of the former Matthew Henson Public Housing Project.

- On October 19, 1909, Henson was the guest of honor at a dinner ceremony held by the Colored Citizens of New York, where he was honored by toasts and given a gold watch and chain.
- In 1937, The Explorers Club, under its "polar" President Vilhjalmur Stefansson, invited Henson to join its ranks.
- In 1940, a public housing project, for affordable housing for Phoenix African Americans, was named after Matthew Henson. The former site of the project was recognized as part of a historic district by the Phoenix Historic Property Register in June 2005. Only one courtyard with the original buildings remains.
- In 1940, Henson was honored with one of the 33 dioramas at the American Negro Exposition in Chicago.
- In 1945, Henson and other Peary aides were given U.S. Navy medals for their Arctic achievements.
- In 1948, the Explorers Club awarded the explorer its highest rank of Honorary Member, an honor reserved for no more than 20 living members at a time.
- In 1954, Henson was invited to the White House.
- Before his death in 1955, Henson received honorary doctoral degrees from Howard University and Morgan State University.
- In 1961, a plaque commemorating Henson was placed in the rotunda of the Maryland State House.
- On May 28, 1986, the United States Postal Service issued a 22 cent postage stamp in honor of Henson and Peary; they were previously honored in 1959, but not by name.
- In 1988 Henson and his wife Lucy were reinterred in Arlington National Cemetery, with a monument to his exploring achievements, near Peary's grave and monument. Many members from his Inuit descendants (Anauakaq's children) and extended American family attended.
- In October 1996, the United States Navy commissioned USNS Henson, a Pathfinder-class oceanographic survey ship, named in honor of Matthew Henson.
- In 2000, the National Geographic Society awarded the Hubbard Medal to Matthew A. Henson posthumously. The medal was presented to Henson's great-niece Audrey Mebane at the newly named Matthew A. Henson Earth Conservation Center in Washington, D.C.; in addition, the NGS established a scholarship in Henson's name.
- Places in Maryland named in Henson's honor include the following: Matthew Henson State Park in Aspen Hill, Maryland, Matthew Henson Middle School in Pomonkey, and elementary schools named for him in Baltimore and Palmer Park, Maryland.
- The Henson Glacier (Greenland) was named after him.
- In 2008–2009, a 100th anniversary expedition to the North Pole was undertaken in honor of Henson by Dwayne Fields.
- In 2009 at larger-than-life statue of Mathew Henson and his lead sled dog, King, was created by John J. Giannotti. It stands in front of the Camden Shipyard & Maritime Museum, located at 1910, S. Broadway, Camden, NJ, in the Waterfront South Historic District. A plaque on the base of the statue commemorates a ship called the Kite. Stones brought back on the Kite from one of the Henson-Peary explorations were used to build part of the former Church of Our Saviour. This historic structure is now home to the museum and the Mathew Henson Arctic Explorer Room.
- In October 2020, the previously named Columbus GPS Block III satellite was renamed after the launch as Matthew Henson.
- In September 2021, on the proposal of an intern at the Lunar and Planetary Institute, a crater at the south pole of the Moon, located between Sverdrup and de Gerlache craters, was named Henson after him.

== Representation in media ==
- "Matthew Henson, Black Explorer" is part of the series "The Scooby-Doo Gang: Black Explorers" released in 1978 by Hanna-Barbera Educational Filmstrips. Catalog number 52410.
- S. Allen Counter's book, North Pole Legacy: Black, White and Eskimo (1991), discusses the explorations, as well as Peary and Henson's "country wives" (Inuit women) and their part-Inuit descendants, and historical race relations. He made a film documentary by the same name, shown on the Monitor Channel in 1992.
- The 1998 TV movie Glory & Honor was about the Peary-Henson explorations and their lives. Henson was played by Delroy Lindo, and Henry Czerny played Robert Peary. The film won a Primetime Emmy and Lindo won a Golden Satellite Award for his performance.
- Henson's role in polar expeditions was included in E.L. Doctorow's novel Ragtime (1975).
- Donna Jo Napoli's young adult novel, North, is set against Henson's life and role in polar expeditions.
- In 2012, the German artist Simon Schwartz published a graphic novel about Henson, entitled Packeis (pack ice), which won the Max & Moritz Prize for the "Best German-language Comic Book." The novel was published in English as First Man: Reimagining Matthew Henson in 2015.
- In the graphic novel Sous le soleil de minuit, published in 2015 by writer Juan Díaz Canales and artist Rubén Pellejero, Henson helps Corto Maltese in his Alaskan adventure in 1915.
- Henson's story is featured in Kevin Hart's Guide to Black History on Netflix.
- Henson is named in response to the question "Who was the first man to set foot on the North Pole?" in Stevie Wonder's song Black Man on the album Songs in the Key of Life.
- His life and the polar exploration is retold in the 1948 radio drama "Arctic Autograph", a presentation from the Destination Freedom series, written by Richard Durham.
