= In the Motherhood =

- Genre: Sitcom
- Created by: Alexandra Rushfield; Jennifer Konner
- Starring: Cheryl Hines; Jessica St. Clair; Horatio Sanz; RonReaco Lee; Megan Mullally
- Composers: Anna Waronker; Roddy Bottum
- Country of origin: United States
- Original language: English
- No. of seasons: 1
- No. of episodes: 7 (2 unaired)

Production
- Executive producers: Alexandra Rushfield; David Lang; Jennifer Konner; Peter Tortorici; Stu Bloomberg
- Camera setup: Single-camera
- Running time: 30 minutes
- Production companies: Spud TV; Mindshare Entertainment; Pointy Bird Productions; ABC Studios

Original release
- Network: ABC
- Release: March 26 – June 25, 2009

Related
- Based on the online web series

In the Motherhood is an American television sitcom that debuted on ABC as a midseason entry and ran from March 26 to June 25, 2009. The series was produced by ABC Studios in association with Spud TV and Mindshare Entertainment.

== Plot ==
The series focused on Rosemary, Jane, and Emily, loosely inspired by real-life everyday moms.

Rosemary, who has been married numerous times but currently single, is a fast and loose free-wheeling mom with a teenaged son, Sid, who seems to be more responsible than his non-traditional mother.

Rosemary's best friend, Jane, is a recently divorced mother of two girls, pre-teen Annie, and eight-month-old Sophie. As she tries to keep her career and home afloat, Jane has also hired a "manny," Horatio, to help her out with her working mother duties. Horatio also has the ability to "communicate" with Sophie and believes she is the only person that really "gets" him.

Jane's younger sister, Emily, is a model stay-at-home-super-mom for her two young children, Esther and Bill. Emily also believes in perfection which she sees as key to her family life and takes parenting as seriously as any mother could. Her home is a work of art, and her kids are polite and sweet. Emily is married to Jason, the breadwinner in the family, who likes his food to be organic and determined to make sure that his family is at the top of their class.

== Cast and characters ==
=== Main cast ===
- Cheryl Hines as Jane
- Jessica St. Clair as Emily
- Horatio Sanz as Horatio
- RonReaco Lee as Jason
- Megan Mullally as Rosemary

=== Recurring cast ===
- Rachael Harris as Blair
- Yara Shahidi as Esther
- Sayeed Shahidi as Bill

== Production ==
Loosely based on the popular online web series created by Mindshare and produced by Science + Fiction and Microsoft's Branded Entertainment and Experience Team (BEET) in 2007 in conjunction with Suave hair care products and Sprint Nextel, this adaptation chronicled the daily and hilarious perils of three mothers, with most of their stories being adapted from everyday real-life mothers. The success of the webisodes led to ABC's announcement to order 7 initial episodes for the 2008-2009 TV season after the premiere. Sprint and Suave had an involvement in the series as well.

== Casting ==
Whereas the webisodes featured Leah Remini, Jenny McCarthy, and Chelsea Handler in the lead roles, Handler was supposed to be the only cast member from the series to make the transition to the small screen. But on November 24, 2008, TV Guide reported that the series would instead star Megan Mullally and Cheryl Hines. In addition, Horatio Sanz and Jessica St. Clair had also been cast, with Sanz playing Hines's manny and St. Clair playing Hines's "intimidating younger sister," who doesn't discipline her children. Handler decided to drop out of the project due to scheduling commitments to her E! show Chelsea Lately.

== Reception and scheduling ==
The series had not been received well by critics, and despite ABC's promotional push in the hope of weakening NBC's Thursday night comedy lineup, not many viewers, especially fans of the original web series, flocked to see the show.

On April 30, 2009, ABC announced that it was pulling the series. Followed by the return of Ugly Betty to the schedule while on May 15, 2009, ABC announced that In the Motherhood would return once again, to burn off the remaining episodes. But on June 30, 2009, ABC announced that they pulled In the Motherhood and instead doubled up on Samantha Who? for Thursday, July 2 and Thursday, July 9 at 8:30PM Eastern/7:30PM Central.

== Episodes ==
No.	Title	Directed by	Written by	Original release date	Prod. code	US viewers (millions)
1	"It Takes a Village Idiot"	Richard Shepard	Jennifer Konner & Alexandra Rushfield	March 26, 2009	002	N/A
Rosemary discovers the special attention pregnant ladies are afforded.
2	"Vacation"	Beth McCarthy-Miller	Paul Corrigan & Brad Walsh	April 2, 2009	001	N/A
Jane's vacation with baby Sophie is anything but relaxing.
3	"Bully"	Gail Mancuso	Alan J. Higgins	April 9, 2009	004	N/A
Jane becomes a bully at work in order to scare her boss.
4	"Practice What You Preach"	Jamie Babbit	Liz Cackowski & Maggie Carey	April 16, 2009	005	N/A
Emily and Jason are concerned with Bill's imaginary friend.
5	"Shepfather"	Lee Shallat-Chemel	Craig DiGregorio	June 25, 2009	003	N/A
Jane becomes jealous when her boyfriend Shep shows off his parenting skills.
6	"Where There's a Will, There's a Wake"	Linda Mendoza	Annie Mumolo	Unaired	006	TBD
Emily tries to mold Jane into the perfect parent.
7	"In Sickness and In Health"	Lee Shallat Chemel	Joel Madison	Unaired	007	TBD
Jane tries to prove that motherhood isn't getting in the way of her work.

== U.S. Nielsen ratings ==
Order	Episode	Airdate	Rating	Share	Rating/Share (18-49)	Viewers (millions)	Rank (Overall)
1	"It Takes a Village Idiot"	March 26, 2009	4.6	7	2.2/6	6.69	TBA
2	"Vacation"	April 2, 2009	3.4	6	1.6/5	5.00	TBA
3	"Bully"	April 9, 2009	TBA	TBA	1.3/4	4.57	TBA
4	"Practice What You Preach"	April 16, 2009	TBA	TBA	1.4/5	4.70	TBA
5	"Shepfather"	June 25, 2009	2.0	TBA	0.7/2	2.69	TBA
6	"Where There's a Will, There's a Wake"	UNAIRED	TBA	TBA	TBA	TBA	TBA
7	"In Sickness and In Health"	UNAIRED	TBA	TBA	TBA	TBA	TBA
