= Danny (talk show) =

- Starring: Danny Bonaduce
- Country of origin: United States
- Original language: English

Production
- Running time: 60 minutes
- Production company: Faded Denim Productions

Original release
- Network: Syndication
- Release: 1995 – 1996

Danny! (aka The Danny Bonaduce Show) is an American syndicated talk show hosted by Danny Bonaduce that ran from 1995 to 1996. The show is notable for its first episode featuring a majority of his fellow cast members from The Partridge Family as his guests. The show was taped in Chicago and featured a local group, The Critics, as house band.

The show addressed one topic per episode, such as being overweight, or inter-office romances. At times Bonaduce's studio audience took part in activities, including water balloon fights. The series’ cancellation was announced in December 1995, with talk show backlash given as the reason for the show ending. The last episode was taped on December 22, 1995, and reruns were to be broadcast until February 2, 1996.
