= Jenni Konner =

American TV writer, producer, and director (born 1971)

- Born: Jennifer A. Konner; May 15, 1971 (age 55); New York City, U.S.
- Education: Sarah Lawrence College
- Occupations: Television writer, producer, director
- Years active: 1990s–present
- Partner: Richard Shepard
- Children: 2
- Parent(s): Lawrence Konner; Ronnie Wenker-Konner

Jennifer A. Konner (born May 15, 1971) is an American television writer, producer, and director. She was the co-showrunner and writer with Lena Dunham of the HBO series Girls. In 2016, she directed the season finale of the fifth season of Girls titled "I Love You Baby", and in 2017, she directed the episode "Latching", which served as the series finale; both episodes were co-written by Judd Apatow, Dunham, and Konner.

With Lena Dunham, she ran a production company and is co-founder of the feminist newsletter Lenny Letter and its Random House imprint, Lenny Books.

== Early life ==
Konner was born to a Jewish family in Brooklyn, New York, and grew up in Los Angeles, California. She is daughter of American television writers Lawrence Konner and Ronnie Wenker-Konner (née Wenker). Konner has a younger brother, Jeremy Konner, who directed and produced the Comedy Central program Drunk History.

Konner graduated from Crossroads School, a progressive high school in Santa Monica. In 1994, Konner graduated from Sarah Lawrence College.

== Career ==
After finishing school, Konner began working with friend and writing partner Alexandra Rushfield. They were both hired as writers for Judd Apatow's sitcom Undeclared. They then went on to create two short-lived network shows together: Help Me Help You and In the Motherhood. After that the pair stopped writing together and Konner began working as a script doctor. She was hired on a few big-budget Hollywood films to help the writers flesh out their female characters, most notably Transformers: Dark of the Moon.

=== Partnership with Lena Dunham and Girls ===
Konner was first introduced to Lena Dunham's work through watching Dunham's 2010 film Tiny Furniture. Konner was a big fan of the film and so jumped at the opportunity when HBO offered her the role of supervising Dunham for her new series Girls. Konner became the show's official co-show-runner, an executive producer, and she wrote occasional episodes. The show premiered on HBO in 2012 and won numerous awards. Dunham and Konner were good friends and collaborated on several other projects. They also started a production company together called A Casual Romance, with the intent of addressing the gender imbalance in TV and film. On her relationship with Dunham, Konner said, in 2013, "We just really love spending time together, which is good because we mostly have to be together all day every day."

In 2017, Konner and her Girls co-showrunner Lena Dunham put out a joint statement to the Hollywood Reporter, publicly defending staff writer Murray Miller against sexual assault allegations made by Aurora Perrineau and claiming to have "insider knowledge of Murray's situation". Dunham later apologized for her statement and admitted that she and Konner had no "insider information" and that this claim had been a lie. While Dunham issued a public apology for her actions, Konner has to date never issued a public apology.

In July 2018, Dunham and Konner released a joint statement to The Hollywood Reporter where they stated they had made the decision to split as producing partners ahead of the December expiration date of their joint overall deal with HBO for their A Casual Romance Productions banner. At the time, the reason for this sudden decision was not made public but in January 2022 Dunham told the Hollywood Reporter that midway through production on Camping, she had left to enter rehab. When she returned from rehab, Dunham and Konner went their separate ways. When asked if the "timing was more than coincidental" with the split coming after her rehab stint, Dunham responded, "I think my recovery played a part in the break with Jenni insofar as it showed me that I needed to pause and clear the slate. I needed to almost start again and just hear my own voice."

=== Other work ===
In January 2015, Dunham and Konner released a documentary for HBO about Hilary Knight, the illustrator of the children's books Eloise. Konner worked as the Executive Producer on the project and it was their first production with their company A Casual Romance. The production company's most recent work, Suited, premiered at the Sundance Film Festival on January 24, 2016. The film is a documentary that looks at a Brooklyn-based tailoring company that tailors suits for members of the LGBTQ community. It was directed by Jason Benjamin and produced by Konner and Dunham. Suited premiered on HBO in June 2016.

In 2018 Konner began her own production company I Am Jenni Konner Productions. The company has produced the HBO series Camping and Generation.

=== Lenny Letter ===
Konner and Lena Dunham collaborated to create Lenny Letter, a weekly online feminist newsletter. The pair started the project with the intention of giving a platform to young female voices to discuss feminist issues. The newsletter features political essays, personal stories, interviews, artwork, and even an advice column from Dunham and Konner themselves called "Letters to Lenny". One notable article was an essay written by actress Jennifer Lawrence about the gender wage gap in Hollywood.

Lenny Letter was supported by Hearst Corporation advertising. In December 2017, it was then supported by Condé Nast.

Konner and Dunham also worked with Random House on a book imprint that tried to extend the aims of Lenny Letter to book publishing.

In October 2018, it was announced the website would be shutting down, reportedly due to a decline in subscribers and a failure to build momentum on other platforms. Contributors were told a week prior to the shut down, receiving fees for unpublished written works.

== Personal life ==
Konner lives in Los Angeles with her two children and her husband, Richard Shepard.

== Filmography ==
Year	Title	Role
1999	George and Martha	Writer
2001–2002	Undeclared	Writer, Story Editor
2002	What I Like About You	Writer
2003	The O'Keefes	Writer
2004	The Stones	Executive Story Editor
2005	Pool Guys	Writer, executive producer
2006–2007	Help Me Help You	Writer, executive producer
2008	Bad Mother's Handbook	Writer, executive producer
2009	In the Motherhood	Writer, executive producer
2012–2017	Girls	Showrunner, Writer, Director, Executive Producer
2015	It's Me, Hilary: The Man Who Drew Eloise	Executive Producer
2016	Suited	Producer
2016	Max	Executive producer
2018	Lenny	Executive producer
2018	Camping	Creator, Writer, Director, Executive Producer
2021	Generation	Executive Producer
2022	Welcome to Chippendales	Showrunner, Writer, Executive Producer
2022	Single Drunk Female	Writer, Executive Producer
2025	Deli Boys	Director, Executive Producer
2025	Nobody Wants This	Showrunner, Writer, Executive Producer
TBA	The Bobby Love Story	Executive Producer
