= Camping (American TV series) =

2018 American comedy television series

- Genre: Comedy
- Created by: Lena Dunham; Jenni Konner
- Based on: Camping by Julia Davis
- Starring: Jennifer Garner; David Tennant; Juliette Lewis; Ione Skye; Chris Sullivan; Cheyenne Haynes; Arturo Del Puerto; Janicza Bravo; Brett Gelman
- Composer: Ben Lee
- Country of origin: United States
- Original language: English
- No. of seasons: 1
- No. of episodes: 8

Production
- Executive producers: Jenni Konner; Lena Dunham; Ilene S. Landress; John Riggi; Julia Davis; Christine Langan; Tom Lassally
- Producers: Travon Free; Regina Heyman
- Cinematography: Quyen Tran
- Editors: Paul Zucker; Kabir Akhtar; Christal A. Khatib
- Camera setup: Single-camera
- Running time: 28–31 minutes
- Production companies: Hush Ho; Baby Cow Productions; I Am Jenni Konner Productions; Good Thing Going; HBO Enterprises

Original release
- Network: HBO
- Release: October 14 – December 2, 2018

Camping is an American comedy television series, based on the British television series of the same name created by Julia Davis. It premiered on October 14, 2018, on HBO. The series was created by Lena Dunham and Jenni Konner and stars an ensemble cast including Jennifer Garner, David Tennant, Juliette Lewis, Ione Skye, Chris Sullivan, Cheyenne Haynes, Arturo Del Puerto, Janicza Bravo, and Brett Gelman.

== Premise ==
Camping follows "Walt, whose 45th birthday was supposed to be a delightful weekend back to nature, at least according to his obsessively organized and aggressively controlling wife Kathryn. But when the camping trip gathers Kathryn's meek sister, holier than thou ex-best friend and a free-spirited tagalong in one place, it becomes a weekend of tested marriages and woman on woman crime that won't soon be forgotten. Plus, bears."

== Cast and characters ==
=== Main ===
- Jennifer Garner as Kathryn McSorley-Jodell, a minor Instagram celebrity and wife of Walt and mother to Orvis
- David Tennant as Walt Jodell, Kathryn's husband who is celebrating his 45th birthday on the camping trip
- Arturo Del Puerto as Miguel, a friend of Walt and Kathryn's who recently separated from his wife Margaret. Expected not to attend the trip, he surprises the group after showing up with his new girlfriend Jandice.
- Juliette Lewis as Jandice, a reiki healer and Miguel's new girlfriend. Not invited to attend, her presence on the trip causes Kathryn great annoyance.
- Ione Skye as Carleen, Kathryn's sister and Joe's girlfriend
- Chris Sullivan as Joe, Carleen's husband and Sol's father who is dealing with an oxycontin addiction
- Janicza Bravo as Nina-Joy, a friend of Kathryn and Walt's and wife of George
- Brett Gelman as George, a friend of Kathryn and Walt's and husband of Nina-Joy

=== Recurring ===
- Cheyenne Haynes as Sol, the daughter of Joe. She was not initially supposed to come along on the camping trip due to Kathryn's "no kids" rule but is forced to attend after her sleepover plans fall through.
- Duncan Joiner as Orvis, the son of Kathryn and Walt
- Bridget Everett as Harry, the proprietor of the Brown Bear Lake camping ground
- Rhiannon Wryn as Tyler, a girl whom Sol meets in town
- Yimmy Yim as Nan, the wife of Harry who runs the camping ground with her
- Rene Gube as Braylen, a man with whom Nina-Joy has been cheating on George

=== Guest ===
- John Riggi as Shopkeeper ("Going to Town"), the co-owner of Antics, a shop that Jandice and Miguel look around and eventually have sex in
- Mary-Pat Green as Clementine ("Going to Town"), a waitress at Yee Haw's Saloon who brings the group a round of jelly-doughnut flavored shots
- Busy Philipps as Allison ("Up All Night"), a friend of Nina-Joy on camping trip with Beth-Ann and Nia. She expresses a deep-seated feeling of antipathy towards Kathryn after Nina-Joy mentions she spending the weekend with her.
- Nicole Richie as Beth-Ann ("Up All Night"), a friend of Allison and Nia's who goes camping with her every year allowing her respite from her kids
- Hari Nef as Nia ("Up All Night"), a friend of Allison and Beth-Ann's who is accompanying them on their weekend camping trip

== Episodes ==
Camping, season 1 episodes
No.	Title	Directed by	Written by	Original release date	U.S. viewers (millions)
1	"Pilot"	Jenni Konner	Lena Dunham & Jenni Konner	October 14, 2018	0.544
2	"Going to Town"	Jenni Konner	Lena Dunham & Jenni Konner	October 21, 2018	0.404
3	"Fishing Trip"	John Riggi	John Riggi	October 28, 2018	0.384
4	"Up All Night"	Wendey Stanzler	Paula Pell	November 4, 2018	0.265
5	"Just Plain Mad"	Jude Weng	Travon Free & Lena Dunham	November 11, 2018	0.246
6	"Carleen?!"	Wendey Stanzler	Lena Dunham	November 18, 2018	0.273
7	"Birthday Party (Part 1)"	Jude Weng	Lena Dunham & Jenni Konner	November 25, 2018	0.298
8	"Birthday Party (Part 2)"	Jason Benjamin	Lena Dunham & Jenni Konner	December 2, 2018	0.308

== Production ==
=== Development ===
The series is based on the British series Camping created by Julia Davis. The original series was nominated for two BAFTAs in the Best Scripted Comedy and Best Comedy Writer categories.

On February 8, 2018, it was announced that HBO had given the production a series order consisting of eight half-hour episodes. Lena Dunham and Jenni Konner had been developing the series with HBO for some time prior to the announcement and finally received a green light following Jennifer Garner's commitment to star. The series was expected to be written by Dunham and Konner, who would also executive produce alongside Julia Davis, Christine Langan, and Ilene S. Landress. Production companies involved in the series were slated to include A Casual Romance, Hush Ho, and Baby Cow Productions.

On March 19, 2018, it was reported that Tom Lassally had joined the series as an executive producer for 3 Arts Entertainment. On July 25, 2018, it was announced that the series would premiere on October 14, 2018.

=== Casting ===
Alongside the initial series announcement, it was reported that Jennifer Garner had been cast in the series' lead role. On March 16, 2018, it was announced that David Tennant had joined the main cast in the lead male role. A few days later, it was reported that Janicza Bravo, Arturo Del Puerto, Brett Gelman, and Juliette Lewis had been cast as series regulars and that Bridget Everett was joining the series in a recurring capacity. That same month, Ione Skye also joined the main cast. On May 16, 2018, it was reported that Busy Philipps and Nicole Richie had joined the cast of the series in undisclosed capacity.

=== Filming ===
Principal photography was expected to begin in the spring of 2018 in Los Angeles.

== Release ==
On July 25, 2018, the series held a panel at the Television Critics Association's annual summer press tour featuring executive producer Jenni Konner and cast member Jennifer Garner. The following day, a teaser trailer for the series was released.

The series was subsequently released on Sky Atlantic in the UK.

== Reception ==
=== Critical response ===
The series was met with a mixed to negative response from critics upon its premiere. On the review aggregation website Rotten Tomatoes, the first season holds a 27% approval rating, with an average rating of 4.84 out of 10 based on 51 reviews. The website's critical consensus reads, "The first season of Camping makes it difficult to determine who the least happy campers are: those on the screen or those watching it." Metacritic, which uses a weighted average, assigned the season a score of 50 out of 100 based on 29 critics, indicating "mixed or average reviews".

In a negative review, Variety's Caroline Farmke criticized the series saying, "the series wastes its potential, showing so little insight or movement that watching Camping becomes nearly as unpleasant as it is for the characters living through it."

In another unfavorable critique, Collider's Andrea Reiher was equally dismissive saying:

"It truly leaves one wondering: What is the point of this show? If it's not laughs or personal growth, is it just a slice-of-life comedy about unlikable people? That's not enough, especially in this overcrowded TV landscape. Plus, who has the patience to wait half a season or more before finding characters they want to stay with on this journey? Despite high hopes for this combination of Dunham's writing talent and Garner's charisma, there just isn't enough over the first four episodes to really make this a comedy worth tuning into. You can skip this Camping trip."

In a more mixed assessment, Indiewire's Ben Travers was slightly more positive saying, "Camping is certainly an ensemble-driven comedy, and the supporting cast is easier to get behind, but that's like saying it's easier to build a fire with a piece of glass than two rocks. Both will test your patience, and they don't work well together."

Gwen Inhat of The A.V. Club summed up her D+ review, "It’s a waste of a fine cast and a bucolic setting. One possible upside for the series is that Camping might inspire people to go camping themselves, just to get away from TV for awhile".

In a rare positive evaluation, The Wall Street Journal's John Anderson described the series as "A very funny, quasi-cringy series that takes the Sartre-esque point of view into the great outdoors."

In the UK, The Guardian gave the show a two-star rating. The review noted that, whilst some of the performances were good, "The reworking deviates from the darkness and dread that made the original black comedy so perfect".

Due to the mostly negative reviews, the show was cancelled after one season.

=== Ratings ===
Viewership and ratings per episode of Camping
No.	Title	Air date	Rating (18–49)	Viewers (millions)	DVR viewers (millions)	Total viewers (millions)
1	"Pilot"	October 14, 2018	0.1	0.544	0.267	0.811
2	"Going to Town"	October 21, 2018	0.1	0.404	0.181	0.585
3	"Fishing Trip"	October 28, 2018	0.1	0.384	0.188	0.572
4	"Up All Night"	November 4, 2018	0.1	0.265	0.169	0.434
5	"Just Plain Mad"	November 11, 2018	0.1	0.246	0.233	0.479
6	"Carleen?!"	November 18, 2018	0.1	0.273	0.177	0.450
7	"Birthday Party (Part 1)"	November 25, 2018	0.1	0.298	0.183	0.481
8	"Birthday Party (Part 2)"	December 2, 2018	0.1	0.308	0.172	0.480
