= My Kid's a Star =

- Presented by: Cameron Daddo
- Country of origin: Australia
- No. of seasons: 1
- No. of episodes: 6

Production
- Running time: 30 minutes (including commercials)

Original release
- Network: Nine Network
- Release: 9 April – 31 May 2008

My Kid's a Star is an Australian reality/talent show program based on the American series I Know My Kid's a Star. Hosted by Cameron Daddo, it started airing during prime time on the Nine Network from 9 April 2008 in a 60-minute format. Due to low ratings, it later moved to a weekend timeslot, where it aired in a 30-minute format.

The show follows 10 child performers and their parents on a six-week talent boot camp that will see one of the performers leave with $50,000 and the title of "child star". The young performers will be judged by a three-member panel which includes former The Partridge Family actor Danny Bonaduce, who was also the host in the original American version.

The show has raised some controversy for focusing on the antics of the stage parents rather than the young performers, and promos of the show prominently featured this aspect of the program. Some of the parents of the contestants have claimed that Nine misled them over the content of the show.

== See also ==
- List of programs broadcast by Nine Network
- List of Australian television series
