= The Other Half (talk show) =

- Starring: Dick Clark; Danny Bonaduce; Mario Lopez; Dorian Gregory; Jan Adams
- Country of origin: United States

Production
- Running time: 60 minutes
- Production companies: Blanki & Bodi Productions; Fisher Entertainment; NBC Enterprises

Original release
- Network: Syndication
- Release: September 10, 2001 – May 21, 2003

The Other Half is an American daytime talk show produced for broadcast syndication by NBC Studios, which aired from 2001 to 2003, mainly on NBC's owned-and-operated stations but syndicated to markets outside those in which NBC owned a station. The show was hosted by Dick Clark, actors Danny Bonaduce and Mario Lopez, and cosmetic surgeon Dr. Jan Adams, who was later replaced by actor Dorian Gregory.

It was intended as a male counterpart to the popular ABC talk show The View and, despite its inability to find an audience, it earned a few Emmy Award nominations.
