= I Know My Kid's a Star =

- Starring: Danny Bonaduce; Marki Costello
- Country of origin: United States
- No. of episodes: 8

Production
- Running time: 60 minutes
- Production company: 3 Ball Productions

Original release
- Network: VH1
- Release: March 2008 – May 2008

I Know My Kid's a Star is an American competitive reality television television series for aspiring child actors and their parents. The show aired from March to May 2008 on VH1. The show's host and primary judge is Danny Bonaduce, who is best known as having been a child actor himself on the 1970s TV show The Partridge Family. Casting agent Marki Costello stars as co-host and secondary judge. The show features ten parent/child pairings, with each pair working together as a team to further the child's career.

The parents and children live together in one house. Week to week, the teams work on various performance-related challenges. The show consists of eight episodes, with one team sent home at the end of each episode. The team that wins the final competition is awarded $50,000 and a one-year contract for the child with a Hollywood agent.

An Australian version, titled My Kid's a Star and also featuring Bonaduce as a judge, with Cameron Daddo as host, aired nearly concurrently, from April 9 to May 31, 2008.

== Eliminations ==
Placing	Teams	Episodes								
Placing	Teams	1	2	3	4	5	6	7	8	
01	Shannon & McKenzie	IN	IN	LOW	IN	LOW	LOW	IN	IN	WINNER
02	Helene & Cheyenne	IN	WIN	WIN	IN	WIN	IN	IN	IN	OUT
03	Pam & Mary Jo	IN	IN	IN	LOW	LOW	LOW	LOW	OUT	
04	Gigi & Alai	IN	IN	LOW	IN	LOW	WIN	OUT		
05	Sandy & Gian	IN	IN	IN	WIN	IN	OUT			
06	Lisia & Hayley	IN	IN	LOW	LOW	OUT				
07	Rocky & Hayley	LOW	LOW	IN	OUT					
08	Shari & Cameron	IN	IN	OUT						
09	Kevin & Devon	IN	OUT							
10	Jonathon & Austin	OUT								

== Contestants ==
Parent	Child	Age	Talent	Judges' Reason They're Out	Eliminated
Shannon Knapps	McKenzie Knapps	9	Acting, Singing, Dancing	As a team, Shannon and McKenzie worked well together to learn from each challenge and had the right attitude to succeed in Hollywood.	Winner
Helene Kress	Cheyenne Haynes	11	Acting, Singing, Dancing	As a team, Helene and Cheyenne were very competitive, but the producers thought Helene's attitude would not help Cheyenne make it in Hollywood.	Episode 8
Pam Wold	Mary Jo Wold	12	Acting, TV show host	Pam didn't understand Mary Jo's "brand," but Mary Jo's real personality came across well.	Episode 8
Gigi Hunter	Alai Divinity	12	Dancing	Gigi wasn't ready, but Alai was a sweet girl with a hidden "spark."	Episode 7
Sandy Di Franco	Gian Di Franco	13	Ballroom dancing	Sandy wasn't ready, but Gian was a talented dancer.	Episode 6
Lisia Rousselle	Hayley Rousselle	10	Acting, Singing, Dancing	Lisia wasn't ready, but Hayley was a talented performer.	Episode 5
Melissa "Rocky" Brasselle	Hayley Sanchez	9	Modeling, Singing	Rocky was overshadowing Hayley and was more concerned with her own fame than with her child's.	Episode 4
Shari VanderWerf	Cameron VanderWerf	12	Acting, Singing, Clarinet	Shari wasn't ready, but Cameron was talented for a beginner.	Episode 3
Kevin Goocher	Devon Goocher	10	Singing	Kevin and Devon lacked enthusiasm for Hollywood, but Devon was a talented singer.	Episode 2
Jonathon Parker	Austin Parker	12	Dancing	Neither Jonathan nor Austin were ready for Hollywood.	Episode 1

== Episodes ==
=== Episode 1 ===
The basics. The children must perform their audition acts for Danny. The parents are quizzed on their Hollywood knowledge by Marki. By the end of the episode, Danny believes that Jonathan and Austin are too unprepared for Hollywood. Danny also says that Austin relies too much on his father's support while performing. For these reasons, Jonathan and Austin Parker are the first team to be sent home.

=== Episode 2 ===
Danny takes the parents on a bus tour of famous child stars' serious, sometimes tragic, missteps. When he asks how many parents still want their child to be a star, all of the parents raise their hands.

The kids are told that they will be doing a voice-over for a cartoon fly. The teams are given a limited time to prepare, and each parent is asked to film their child's rehearsal. Some arguments break out among the parents over use of the camera. At the studio, the parents accompany their children into the recording booth. The children complete their first challenge with varying degrees of success. Hayley seems unprepared at first, but performs well once Rocky is asked to leave the room. At Cheyenne and Helene's turn, Marki notes that Helene is the "acting teacher mom," so Cheyenne is given the extra challenge of acting as if the fly had allergies. Cheyenne performs very well and wins the voice-over challenge, giving her immunity for this elimination.

At the elimination ceremony, Kevin and Devon Goocher are sent home because they seem to lack enthusiasm for Hollywood.

=== Episode 3 ===
Danny takes the teams to a movie set where the kids will film a screen test for a horror movie. The scene contains two children's roles—one larger part and one smaller part. The teams are paired up, and each pair must decide which child gets which role. The parents are told to make sure each child studies the script and knows all the lines.

Each pair of children film their scene as rehearsed. The children are then surprised by being asked to switch roles and refilm the scene. Once again all the judges unanimously decide that Cheyenne is the winner of this challenge, and she is therefore given immunity for the second time in a row. Danny tells Cheyenne that she is "the one to beat." After the win, Helene says that she is an acting coach and the only coach Cheyenne has ever had. Later, Gigi and Pam confront Helene about this, and they, along with Shannon, are not happy about it, although Gigi is a professional dancer and Shannon is an ex actress/pageant girl.

In the end, Shari and Cameron VanderWerf are sent home because Danny believes Shari cannot manage Hollywood. Danny comments on Shari's and Cameron's exit, saying, "If you've never seen a pro exit, that was it."

=== Episode 4 ===
First, the parents are asked to take a head shot of their children. Once again there is limited time and a limited number of cameras, and bickering breaks out among the parents because of this. The photograph chosen as the best is the one of Hayley (Rocky's daughter). The photograph chosen as the worst is Gian's.

After the photograph judging, the kids are challenged to audition for a shoe commercial. A choreographer works with the kids as a group, teaching them the choreography for the commercial. Because of the photograph win, Hayley is given extra time alone with the choreographer. Rocky dances along with Hayley and the choreographer during the private lesson. Even with the extra coaching, Hayley's audition doesn't go well. Although Cheyenne is the only one who knew all the dance moves, Gian wins the commercial challenge because he was enthusiastic and "sold" the shoes with his dance.

Back at the house, Rocky tells Helene, Cheyenne, and Hayley that dancing isn't Hayley's strong suit, but that she (Rocky) can dance. Rocky then dances around the room, demonstrating, while saying, "Meeeeee."

At elimination, Melissa "Rocky" Brasselle and Hayley Sanchez are sent home because Danny still believes Rocky is there for herself and her own fame, not for her daughter.

=== Episode 5 ===
Danny gives the parents the next challenge of styling their child for a stage audition of Oliver Twist. The parents are given $40 each and taken to a thrift store to put together a costume in only twenty minutes.

While the parents shop, Danny gives the children their scripts to prepare for the audition. The kids are happy, confident, and enjoy helping each other prepare. Danny warns the parents that they should push their children to succeed without pushing them over the edge. Despite the warning, conflicts between the parents and children erupt immediately when the parents return. Most of the children seem to lose the joy they had when rehearsing on their own. McKenzie cries to her mom, "I'll never be better than Cheyenne!" and Shannon sternly tells her to buck up.

Before the audition, parents dress their children in the costumes they bought. A dialect coach demonstrates a Cockney accent and gives the children a cheat sheet to help them study. Each child auditions alone on stage. Cheyenne's accent is very good, and she actually cries as part of her performance. Once again, Cheyenne wins the challenge and immunity. Danny says again that "Cheyenne is the one to beat."

At elimination, Lisia and Hayley Rousselle are sent home because Lisia isn't ready for Hollywood. Danny hugs Hayley, and she and Lisia skip out of the house, happy to be going home.

=== Episode 6 ===
Next, the kids must perform in a soap opera screen test. For this challenge, the parents have to judge the children and decide which child will get immunity. Before the screen test, all of the parents except Helene get together and decide not to give immunity to Cheyenne since she's won so many challenges. Gigi tells Pam privately that she will vote for Pam's daughter if Pam will vote for Gigi's daughter.

At the screen test, the parents watch each child's scene. Afterward, Gigi votes for Mary Jo, as promised. Pam refuses to vote because she feels as if she's being ganged up on. Danny tells Pam that she has to vote or she has to go home. Pam reluctantly votes for Gian. Helene realizes that her vote will be the tie-breaking vote (since the others each voted for a different kid, resulting in a four-way tie). She votes for Alai. Gigi and Alai therefore win immunity. Back at the house, Gigi is angry that Pam changed her vote. The children, Alai and Mary Jo, try to get their parents to make up, to no avail.

At the end of the episode, Sandy and Gian Di Franco are sent home because Sandy isn't ready for Hollywood.

=== Episode 7 ===
The kids and parents are unexpectedly awakened by Danny at 6 a.m. They are given just one hour to get ready before leaving the house for an unknown challenge. Danny tells them only that they are going to be in "his neck of the woods." Helene is the only parent to figure out that they are going to be on Danny's radio show.

At the studio, the parents and children are separated for their interviews. Once on the air, the parents resort to insulting each other after each explains why they think their child is the most talented. The children start out civilly, but soon are bickering like their parents. Alai and Mary Jo interrupt each other loudly, vying for air time; Cheyenne talks and sings. McKenzie is quiet, resulting in her effectively shutting herself out of the interview.

Later, back at the house, the children undergo another challenge—making an audition tape for the role of a TV show host. They are told to showcase their real personalities, but also be entertaining and informative. The parents help their children rehearse, as usual. Gigi tells Alai to break after every line, which results in awkward pauses during Alai's audition. Mary Jo is spunky and engaging, showing her real self, which pleases Danny and Marki. Helene coaches Cheyenne to use a conversational tone, which the judges find too low-key for a TV host. McKenzie's performance is still somewhat over the top, but the judges agree it is in line with her own style.

After the TV host challenge, Gigi is angry at Pam, and they once again begin fighting. That night at elimination, Danny asks Pam how the tension is in the house, and she responds honestly.

Gigi Hunter and Alai Divinity are sent home after Danny says that Gigi is not ready for Hollywood. Danny also says that, in his opinion, the original spark that he saw in Alai never reappeared after the first day.

=== Episode 8 ===
(Season Finale)

For the next challenge, Marki asks the parents to brand their children for Hollywood; that is, the parents must decide how to market their children by giving them an easily categorizable image. The parents are then asked to style their child according to the child's brand. A wardrobe consultant helps each team select clothing; even so, all the teams have problems with creating their outfits.

Danny and Marki judge the teams on their chosen brands and outfits. Mary Jo's brand and outfit are deemed inappropriate for her. The judges say that Pam tried to make Mary Jo into Barbie, but Mary Jo isn't like that. Shannon selected a good brand for McKenzie, according to the judges, and Marki says that McKenzie's outfit is perfect. Helene also selected a good brand for Cheyenne, according to the judges, but Marki says Cheyenne's outfit doesn't demonstrate that. Helene says that the stylist gave Cheyenne the opposite of what Helene had requested. Marki tells Helene that it was the parents' responsibility to make the outfits work.

After the teams are judged, Danny surprises the group by telling them that one team is being eliminated immediately. The judges decide to eliminate Pam and Mary Jo because Pam seems unsure of Mary Jo's brand.

The remaining two teams are told there is one final challenge: a talent showcase in front of a live audience. The parents, along with professional coaches, help the children prepare. Both teams choose the same song to perform. The parents flip a coin for it, and Shannon wins. Helene is upset and says that it isn't fair because Cheyenne had been promised that song over a month ago by the producers. McKenzie tries to smooth things over with the other team, but Shannon refuses to change the song. She has heard Cheyenne rehearsing the song in the house and decides that McKenzie may be able to trip Cheyenne up by singing the song.

On stage, McKenzie sings Alone by Heart, and she forgets some of the words. Cheyenne sings So Emotional by Whitney Houston. The girls then perform an acting scene together.

The girls' parents are brought on stage, and Danny and Marki give their final judgments in front of the audience.

First, they tell Helene and Cheyenne that, although Cheyenne is very talented, Helene's attitude won't get them very far in Hollywood. As a result, the judges agree that Helene Kress and Cheyenne Haynes are not the best team.

Shannon and McKenzie Knapps are then declared the winners. Danny and Marki tell them that they were chosen not just because of McKenzie's talent, but because they worked well together and had the right attitude to succeed in Hollywood.

== Sources ==
- Shawn McKenzie (2008). "I Know My Kid's a Star Review", Entertain Your Brain.
- Hinckley, David (March 20, 2008). "Pity the kids on 'I Know My Kid's a Star'". New York Daily News. Archived from the original on March 22, 2008.
- John Caramanica (April 27, 2008). "Taking stage parenting in a whole new direction", Los Angeles Times.
- Rick McGinnis (May 1, 2008). "The Reality of Child Fame", Metro News.
