= Delroy Lindo =

American actor (born 1952)

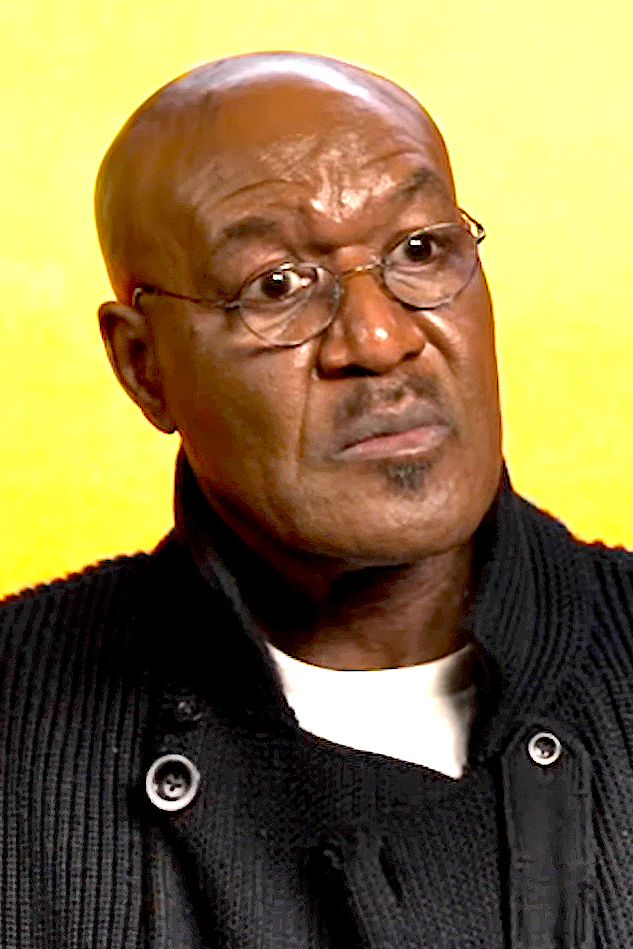
- Lindo in 2025
- Born: Delroy George Lindo; 18 November 1952 (age 73); London, England
- Education: San Francisco State University (BFA); American Conservatory Theater (MFA); New York University (MA)
- Occupation: Actor
- Years active: 1975–present
- Spouse: Nashormeh Lindo (m. 1990)
- Children: 1

Delroy George Lindo (born 18 November 1952) is an English-American actor. Starting his career in the 1975 stage production of Of Mice and Men, he later earned a nomination for the Tony Award for Best Featured Actor in a Play for his work in the 1988 production of Joe Turner's Come and Gone. He received wider recognition with roles in several Spike Lee films, playing West Indian Archie in Malcolm X (1992), Woody Carmichael in Crooklyn (1994), and Rodney Little in Clockers (1995).

He gained further recognition for his role as Paul, a Vietnam War veteran in the film Da 5 Bloods (2020), he earned the New York Film Critics Circle Award for Best Actor and the National Society of Film Critics Award for Best Actor. For his role as blues player Delta Slim in Ryan Coogler's horror film Sinners (2025), he was nominated for the Academy Award for Best Supporting Actor.

Lindo is also known for playing Bo Catlett in Get Shorty (1995), Arthur Rose in The Cider House Rules (1999), Detective Castlebeck in Gone in 60 Seconds (2000), Isaak O'Day in Romeo Must Die (2000), Joe Black in This Christmas (2007), and Bass Reeves in The Harder They Fall (2021). He also voiced the character Beta in the Pixar animated film Up (2009).

On television, he portrayed Matthew Henson in the 1998 television film Glory & Honor, and Supreme Court Justice Clarence Thomas in Strange Justice (1999). Lindo later starred as Alderman Ronin Gibbons in the series The Chicago Code (2011), as Winter in the fantasy drama series Believe (2014), and as Adrian Boseman in The Good Fight (2017–2021).

== Early life ==
Delroy George Lindo was born on 18 November 1952 in the University Hospital Lewisham in Lewisham, London, England, the son of Jamaican parents who were part of the Windrush generation. His mother had immigrated to the UK in 1951 to work as a nurse, and his father worked in various jobs. Lindo grew up in nearby Eltham and attended Woolwich Polytechnic School for Boys. He became interested in acting as a child when he appeared in a nativity play at school.

When he was a teenager, Lindo moved with his mother to Toronto, Ontario, Canada. When he was 16, they moved to the United States, to San Francisco. At the age of 24, Lindo began his studies in acting at the American Conservatory Theater, graduating in 1979.

== Career ==
=== 1970s and 1980s: Early work and theatre success ===
Lindo made his film debut in 1976 with John Candy in the Canadian comedy Find the Lady. He played an army sergeant in More American Graffiti (1979).. Prior to this, he had appeared in small TV roles in the Canadian TV series Police Surgeon in 1974.

For a decade from the early 1980s, Lindo's career was more focused on theatre acting than film, although he has said this was not a conscious decision. In 1982, he debuted on Broadway as a replacement for Danny Glover in "Master Harold"...and the Boys, directed by the play's South African author Athol Fugard. Lindo continued with Master Harold in the national tour, starring with James Earl Jones.

Throughout the 1980s, Lindo worked repeatedly at the Yale Repertory Theatre under artistic director Lloyd Richards. Lindo starred as Walter Lee Younger in the 25th anniversary production of A Raisin in the Sun alongside Mary Alice, Beah Richards, and Courtney B. Vance. Lindo continued with the play when the Roundabout Theatre Company brought it to the Kennedy Center. He cited the experience and the acting guidance from Lloyd Richards as a major turn in his career. Lindo also featured in Yale Rep productions of James Yoshimura's Union Boys and Lee Blessing's Cobb.

In 1988, Richards brought Lindo into an ongoing pre-Broadway production of August Wilson's Joe Turner's Come and Gone to replace Charles Dutton, who had played the role at Yale Rep. Lindo, playing the character Herald Loomis, received critical praise. Boston Globe critic Jay Carr called him "an ax blade, ready to fall." New York Times critic Frank Rich reviewed the performance as "imposing and intense," writing that the play partly hinges on Lindo's gradual change "from a man whose opaque, defeated blackness signals the extinction of that light into a truly luminous 'shining man,' bathing the entire theater in the abundant ecstasy of his liberation." Lindo earned a Tony nomination for the performance, but lost to BD Wong in M. Butterfly. Joe Turner closed in June 1988, after around 105 performances.

=== 1990s: Film breakthrough ===
Lindo returned to film in the 1989 science fiction film The Salute of the Jugger (AKA The Blood of Heroes), which has become a cult classic. Although he had turned down Spike Lee for a role in Do the Right Thing (as one of the minor characters played by Paul Benjamin, Frankie Faison, and Robin Harris), Lee later cast him as West Indian Archie, a psychotic gangster, in Malcolm X (1992) and Woody Carmichael in the drama Crooklyn (1994), which brought Lindo notice. He also played a starring role as a neighborhood drug dealer in Lee's Clockers. On Clockers, Lindo said: "It's an underrated film ... it's a terrific film ... I think it's the subject matter of Clockers that maybe caused more people to not go and see the film ... It was shot beautifully, really interesting visually." In 1995, Lindo was offered a role in Seven Guitars on its pre-Broadway run, but he declined. The Broadway role went to Roger Robinson, who earned a Tony nomination.

Between 1995 and 2000, Lindo co-starred in a string of box office hits including Barry Sonnenfeld's Get Shorty (1995), Ron Howard's Ransom (1996), John Woo's Broken Arrow (1996), Lasse Hallström's The Cider House Rules (1999), Gone in 60 Seconds (2000), and Romeo Must Die (2000). Lindo also had memorable uncredited cameos in Congo (1995) and The Devil's Advocate (1997).

Additionally, Lindo co-starred in Soul of the Game (1996) as baseball player Satchel Paige. In 2026, Lindo said of the film: "It's a wonderful film. I'm really proud of that film ... I watched it five or six years ago and I was speaking with Kevin Rodney Sullivan, who directed it, and I said 'it holds up man. It does. It holds up.'... That holds a special place in my heart." He also appeared as African-American explorer Matthew Henson, in the TV film Glory & Honor, directed by Kevin Hooks. It portrayed Henson's nearly 20-year partnership with Commander Robert Peary in Arctic exploration, and their effort to find the Geographic North Pole in 1909. Lindo received a Satellite Award for his portrayal of Henson.

Lindo also starred as Clarence Thomas in Ernest Dickerson's 1999 TV film Strange Justice. The film, based on the book by Jane Mayer and Jill Abramson, told the story of the 1991 Clarence Thomas confirmation hearings and Anita Hill. The film received a Peabody Award.

=== 2000s and 2010s: Career downturn and transition to television ===
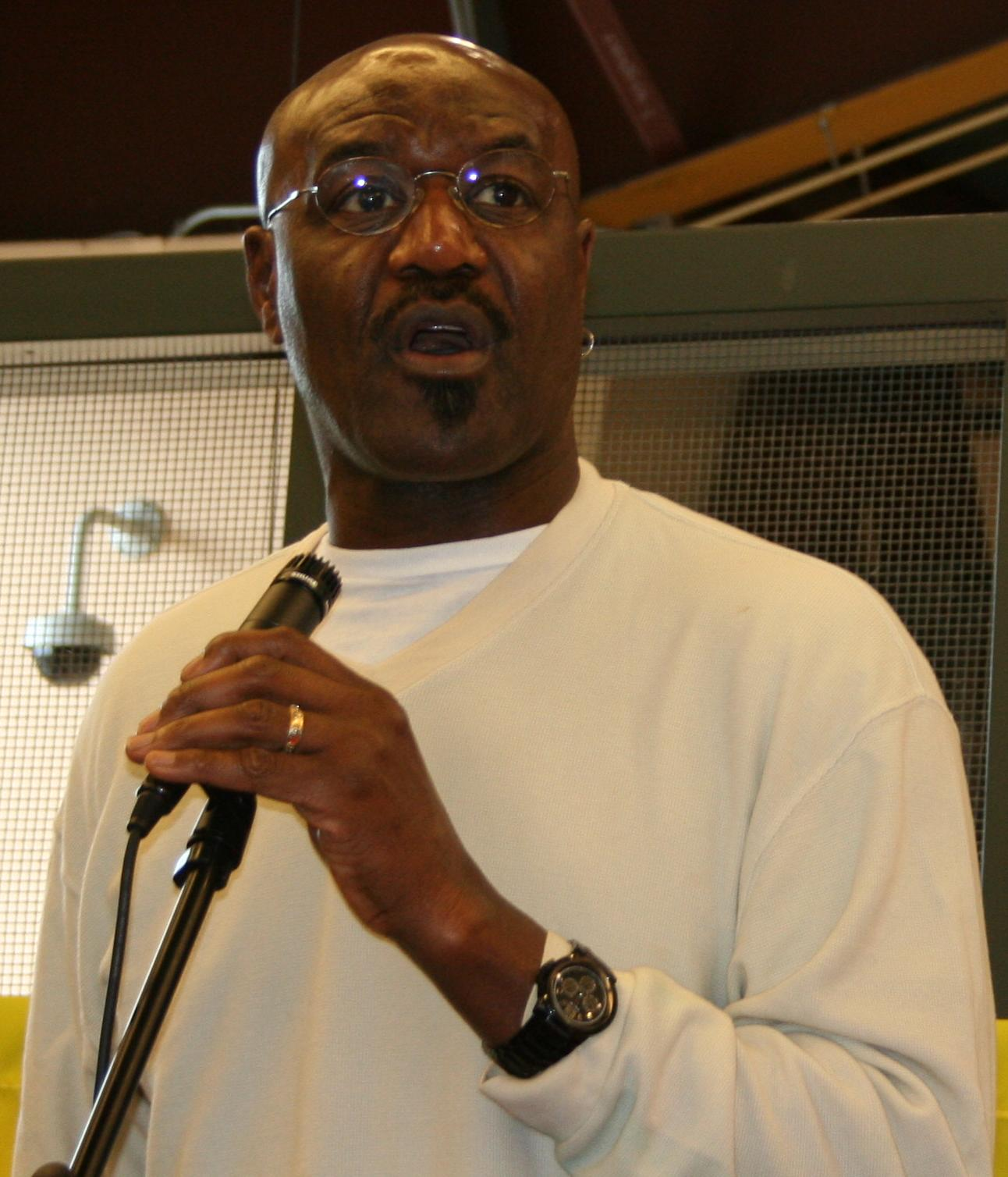
Lindo in 2008

In the early 2000s, Lindo co-starred in a series of poorly received box office bombs including The Last Castle (2001), The Core (2003), Domino (2005), and Sahara (2005). During this time, he also starred in the British independent film Wondrous Oblivion (2003), directed by Paul Morrison, Lindo starred as Dennis Samuels, the father of a Jamaican immigrant family in London in the 1950s. Lindo said he made the film in honour of his parents, who had similarly moved to London in those years.

He was set to return to Broadway in the premiere of August Wilson's Gem of the Ocean in November 2004. During rehearsals for the pre-Broadway staging at the Huntington Theatre, Lindo argued with Wilson over his character and unfavourably contrasted director Marion McClinton to Lloyd Richards, who had directed Lindo in Joe Turner. Anthony Chisholm replaced Lindo in the role after what the production said were "creative differences."

In 2006, Lindo transitioned to television and was seen on the short-lived NBC drama Kidnapped. Following the series' cancellation, Lindo began an association with Berkeley Repertory Theatre in Berkeley, California in 2007, when he directed Tanya Barfield's play The Blue Door. He played Joe Black in This Christmas in 2007. In the autumn of 2008, Lindo revisited Joe Turner's Come and Gone, directing a production at the Berkeley Rep. In 2010, he played the role of elderly seer Bynum in David Lan's production of Joe Turner at the Young Vic Theatre in London.

Lindo was in the main cast of a string of short-lived series including Fox crime drama The Chicago Code (2011), the NBC fantasy series Believe (2014), and the ABC soap Blood & Oil (2015). In 2017, Lindo began playing Adrian Boseman in the CBS legal drama The Good Fight, a role he would star in for the series' first four seasons and reprise as a guest star in its fifth season. Lindo was cast as the lead in an ABC drama pilot Harlem's Kitchen in March 2020. In 2015, Lindo was expected to play Marcus Garvey in a biopic of the black nationalist historical figure that had been in pre-production for several years. Lindo also appeared in a series of poorly received films such as Point Break (2015), the drama Battlecreek (2017), and the horror film Malicious (2018).

=== 2020s: Career resurgence ===
In 2020, Lindo starred in Da 5 Bloods in another collaboration with Spike Lee. For his role in Da 5 Bloods, Lindo received critical acclaim and a number of accolades. David Rooney of The Hollywood Reporter, wrote: "Played with electrifying volatility by Lindo ... (He makes) audacious choices in what might be a career-best performance." Peter Debruge of Variety wrote that Lindo was "outstanding," and added "delivering two long monologues directly to the camera, Lindo is dynamite in the role." Lindo said of the praise he received: "I had never had that consistent, that magnitude of appreciation for my work. It was gargantuan. It was like my mama wrote those reviews." He later credited Lee and Da 5 Bloods for his career resurgence and eventual Oscar nomination.

In 2021, Lindo appeared in The Harder They Fall, written and directed by Jeymes Samuel, as Bass Reeves. He was also cast in the Marvel Studios film Blade in an undisclosed role. It was announced in July 2021 that Lindo would star as Mr. Nancy in the British Amazon Prime miniseries adaptation of Neil Gaiman's Anansi Boys alongside Malachi Kirby. Following sexual misconduct allegations against Gaiman, Lindo said in April 2025 that he did not believe the show "[would] ever see the light of day". A couple years later, Lindo starred in the comedy show Unprisoned and his performance was well received. Kristen Baldwin of Entertainment Weekly wrote: "Delroy Lindo is so good it should be illegal."

In 2025, Lindo played the supporting role of Delta Slim in Ryan Coogler's critically acclaimed and commercially successful film Sinners, with his performance receiving praise and earning him a nomination for the Academy Award for Best Supporting Actor.

==== Upcoming ====
In 2027, Lindo will co-star in Godzilla x Kong: Supernova. On working on the film, Lindo said: "To enter into that universe, very very different but they have a global audience. It's a world unto itself and I actually had a good time working on it." Lindo has recently wrapped filming on his directorial debut Jabari's People, in which he will also star alongside Winston Duke, Marianne Jean-Baptiste, and Wendell Pierce.

== Personal life ==
Lindo married his wife Nashormeh in 1990. They settled in Oakland, California, in 1996, having moved from New York City and preferring the San Francisco Bay Area to Los Angeles. Their son Damiri was born in 2001.

Lindo is a football fan and supports Manchester United.

Upon learning more about the Windrush generation, both through his mother's account and his own role as a Jamaican immigrant in Wondrous Oblivion, Lindo became inspired to study the subject and history further. In 2014, he completed a master's thesis from New York University's Gallatin School.

He was awarded an honorary doctorate in Arts and Humanities from Virginia Union University.

In a 2026 interview, Lindo stated he doesn't view himself as British, stating "My career has been birthed and nurtured in America. I was born in Lewisham hospital, my family's from Jamaica, and my mom was part of the Windrush generation. I am British to that extent, that is my reality."

== Acting credits ==
=== Film ===
Year	Title	Role	Notes
1976	Partners	Drug Kingpin	Film debut
1976	Find the Lady	Sam	
1978	Voice of the Fugitive	Prisoner	Short film
1979	More American Graffiti	Army Sergeant	
1990	The Blood of Heroes	Mbulu	
1990	Mountains of the Moon	Mabruki	
1990	Bright Angel	Harley	
1991	The Hard Way	Captain Brix	
1992	Malcolm X	West Indian Archie	
1993	Blood In Blood Out	"Bonafide"	
1993	Mr. Jones	Howard	
1994	L'exil du roi Behanzin	Behanzin	
1994	Crooklyn	Woody Carmichael	
1995	Clockers	Rodney Little	
1995	Congo	Captain Wanta	Uncredited
1995	Get Shorty	Bo Catlett	
1996	Ransom	FBI Special Agent Lonnie Hawkins	
1996	Broken Arrow	Colonel Max Wilkins	
1996	Feeling Minnesota	"Red"	
1996	The Winner	Kingman	
1997	A Life Less Ordinary	Jackson	
1997	The Devil's Advocate	Phillipe Moyez	Uncredited
1999	Pros & Cons	Kyle Pettibone	
1999	The Cider House Rules	Arthur Rose	
2000	The Book of Stars	Professor	
2000	Gone in 60 Seconds	Detective Roland Castlebeck	
2000	Romeo Must Die	Isaak O'Day	
2001	The One	Agent Harry Roedecker / Arri	
2001	Heist	Bobby Blane	
2001	The Last Castle	Brigadier General Jim Wheeler	
2003	The Core	Dr. Ed "Braz" Brazzleton	
2003	Wondrous Oblivion	Dennis Samuel	
2005	Domino	Claremont Williams	
2005	Sahara	Carl	
2007	This Christmas	Joe Black	
2009	Up	Beta (voice)	
2009	Dug's Special Mission	Beta (voice)	Short film
2009	City of God's Son	(voice)	
2011	The Big Bang	Skeres	
2014	Cymbeline	Belarius	
2015	Do You Believe?	Malachi	
2015	Point Break	FBI Instructor Hall	
2017	Battlecreek	Arthur	
2018	Malicious	Dr. Clark	
2020	Da 5 Bloods	Paul	
2020	LX 2048	Donald Stein	
2021	The Harder They Fall	Bass Reeves	
2025	Sinners	Delta Slim	
2027	Godzilla x Kong: Supernova †	TBA	Post-production
TBA	Jabari's People †	TBA	Post-production; also director

=== Television ===
Year	Title	Role	Notes
1987	Beauty and the Beast	Isaac Stubbs	2 episodes
1989	A Man Called Hawk	Mark Slater	Episode: "Vendetta"
1989	Perfect Witness	Berger	Television film
1991	Against the Law	Ben	Episode: "Hoops"
1996	Soul of the Game	Satchel Paige	Television film
1997	First Time Felon	Calhoun	Television film
1998	Glory & Honor	Matthew Henson	Television film
1999	Strange Justice	Clarence Thomas	Television film
2002	The Simpsons	Gabriel	Voice; episode: "Brawl in the Family"
2003	Profoundly Normal	Ricardo Thornton	Television film
2005	Lackawanna Blues	Mr. Lucious	Television film
2005	The Exonerated	Delbert Tibbs	Television film
2006–2007	Kidnapped	Latimer King	Main cast; 13 episodes
2009	Law & Order: Special Victims Unit	Detective Victor Moran	Episode: "Baggage"
2009	Mercy	Dr. Alfred Parks	Episode: "Can We Get That Drink Now?"
2011	The Chicago Code	Alderman Ronin Gibbons	Main cast; 11 episodes
2013	Robot Chicken	Dopey Smurf, Scorpion Cashier (voices)	Episode: "Papercut to Aorta"
2014	Believe	Dr. Milton Winter	Main cast; 13 episodes
2015	Blood & Oil	"Tip" Harrison	Main cast; 10 episodes
2016	Marvel's Most Wanted	Dominic Fortune	Unaired pilot
2017–2021	The Good Fight	Adrian Boseman	Main cast; 40 episodes
2017	This Is Us	Judge Ernest Bradley	Episode: "The Most Disappointed Man"
2023–2024	Unprisoned	Edwin Alexander	Main cast; also executive producer
2024	Anansi Boys	Mr Nancy	Unaired
2026	Finding Your Roots	Himself	Documentary; Season 12, episode 3

=== Theatre ===
Year	Title	Role	Theatre
1975–76	Of Mice and Men		Royal Manitoba Theatre Centre
1979	Spell Number 7	Performer	Negro Ensemble Company
1981–82	Macbeth	Performer	Cincinnati Playhouse
1982–83	"Master Harold"...and the Boys	Willie	Lyceum Theatre
1983–84	Home	Cephus Miles	Hartford Stage Company
1983–84	A Lesson from Aloes	Performer	Virginia Stage Company
1983–86	A Raisin in the Sun	Walter Lee Younger	Yale Repertory Theatre; Roundabout Theatre Company
1984–85	The Black Branch	Eli Crooner	Actors Theatre of Louisville
1984–85	Advice to the Players	Robert Obosa	Actors Theatre of Louisville
1985	Much Ado About Nothing	Friar Francis	Shakespeare & Company
1985–86	Union Boys	Performer	Yale Repertory Theatre
1986–88	Joe Turner's Come and Gone	Herald Loomis	Huntington Theatre Company, Old Globe Theatre, Ethel Barrymore Theatre
1988–89	Cobb	Oscar Charleston	Yale Repertory Theatre
1989–90	Miss Evers' Boys	Caleb Humphries	Center Stage
1990–91	Julius Caesar	Gaius Cassius	Center Theatre Group
1992–93	Othello	Othello	Great Lakes Theater
1993	The Heliotrope Bouqet by Scott Joplin & Louis Chauvin	Scott Joplin	Playwrights Horizons' Theatre
1998	Othello	Othello	Actors Theatre of Louisville
2008	Agamemnon	Agamemnon	Getty Villa
2009	Things of Dry Hours	Tice Hogan	New York Theatre Workshop
2010	Joe Turner's Come and Gone	Bynum Walker	Young Vic
2012	The Exonerated	Delbert Tibbs	Bleecker Street Theater

=== Video games ===
Year	Title	Role
2009	Up	Beta (voice)

== Awards and nominations ==
Award	Year (Note: The listed year refers to the date of the ceremony, not necessarily the year in which the corresponding season or episode aired.)	Category	Nominee(s)	Result	Ref.
Academy Awards	2026	Best Supporting Actor	Sinners	Nominated	
African-American Film Critics Association	2022	Best Ensemble	The Harder They Fall	Won	
AARP Movies for Grownups	2026	Best Supporting Actor	Sinners	Won	
Austin Film Critics Association	2022	Best Ensemble	The Harder They Fall	Nominated	
Astra Film Awards	2021	Best Actor	Da 5 Bloods	Won	
Astra Film Awards	2026	Best Supporting Actor - Drama	Sinners	Nominated	
Black Film Critics Circle	2025	Best Supporting Actor	Sinners	Won	
Black Reel Awards	2000	Outstanding Supporting Actor	The Cider House Rules	Nominated	
Black Reel Awards	2000	Outstanding Actor, TV Movie or Limited Series	Strange Justice	Nominated	
Black Reel Awards	2006	Outstanding Actor, TV Movie or Limited Series	The Exonerated	Nominated	
Black Reel Awards	2010	Best Voice Performance	Up	Nominated	
Black Reel Awards	2021	Outstanding Actor	Da 5 Bloods	Nominated	
Black Reel Awards	2026	Outstanding Supporting Performance	Sinners	Nominated	
Celebration of Black Cinema and Television	2021	Ensemble Award	The Harder They Fall	Won	
Chicago Indie Critics	2026	Best Supporting Actor	Sinners	Nominated	
Chicago Film Critics Association	1995	Best Supporting Actor	Clockers	Nominated	
Chicago Film Critics Association	2020	Best Actor	Da 5 Bloods	Nominated	
Chicago Film Critics Association	2025	Best Supporting Actor	Sinners	Nominated	
Columbus Film Critics Association	2026	Best Supporting Performance	Sinners	Nominated	
Critics' Choice Super Awards	2021	Best Actor in an Action Movie	Da 5 Bloods	Won	
Critics' Choice Award	2018	Best Supporting Actor in a Drama Series	The Good Fight	Nominated	
Critics' Choice Award	2020	Best Supporting Actor in a Drama Series	The Good Fight	Nominated	
Critics' Choice Award	2021	Best Actor	Da 5 Bloods	Nominated	
Critics' Choice Award	2026	Best Acting Ensemble (Note: Shared with Michael B. Jordan, Wunmi Mosaku, Hailee Steinfeld, Miles Caton, Jack O'Connell, Jayme Lawson, Omar Benson Miller and Li Jun Li.)	Sinners	Won	
Detroit Film Critics Society	2021	Best Ensemble	The Harder They Fall	Nominated	
Drama Desk Award	1988	Outstanding Featured Actor in a Play	Joe Turner's Come and Gone	Nominated	
Florida Film Critics Circle	2025	Best Supporting Actor	Sinners	Nominated	
Gotham Awards	2021	Ensemble Tribute Award	The Harder They Fall	Won	
Gotham Awards	2026	Ensemble Tribute Award	Sinners	Won	
Greater Western New York Film Critics Association	2026	Best Supporting Actor	Sinners	Nominated	
Hollywood Critics Association Awards	2022	Best Cast Ensemble	The Harder They Fall	Nominated	
Hollywood Critics Association Midseason Award	2020	Best Actor	Da 5 Bloods	Won	
Houston Film Critics Society	2026	Best Supporting Actor	Sinners	Nominated	
Kansas City Film Critics Circle	2025	Best Supporting Actor	Sinners	Nominated	
Las Vegas Film Critics Society	1999	Best Supporting Actor	The Cider House Rules	Nominated	
Las Vegas Film Critics Society	2025	Best Supporting Actor	Sinners	Nominated	
London Film Critics' Circle	2026	Supporting Actor of the Year	Sinners	Nominated	
Music City Film Critics Association	2026	Best Supporting Actor	Sinners	Nominated	
NAACP Image Award	1992	Outstanding Supporting Actor in a Motion Picture	Malcolm X	Nominated	
NAACP Image Award	1996	Outstanding Supporting Actor in a Motion Picture	Ransom	Nominated	
NAACP Image Award	1996	Outstanding Actor in a Television Movie	Soul of the Game	Nominated	
NAACP Image Award	2009	Outstanding Supporting Actor in a Drama Series	Law and Order: Special Victims Unit	Won	
NAACP Image Award	2021	Outstanding Actor in a Motion Picture	Da 5 Bloods	Nominated	
NAACP Image Award	2022	Outstanding Supporting Actor in a Motion Picture	The Harder They Fall	Nominated	
NAACP Image Award	2022	Outstanding Ensemble Cast in a Motion Picture	The Harder They Fall	Won	
NAACP Image Award	2026	Outstanding Supporting Actor in a Motion Picture	Sinners	Won	
National Board of Review Awards	2021	Best Cast	The Harder They Fall	Won	
National Society of Film Critics	1992	Best Supporting Actor	Malcolm X	Nominated	
National Society of Film Critics	1995	Best Supporting Actor	Clockers	Nominated	
National Society of Film Critics	1995	Best Supporting Actor	Get Shorty	Nominated	
National Society of Film Critics	2020	Best Actor	Da 5 Bloods	Won	
National Society of Film Critics	2026	Best Supporting Actor	Sinners	Runner-up	
New Jersey Film Critics Circle	2025	Best Supporting Actor	Sinners	Nominated	
New York Film Critics Circle Awards	2020	Best Actor	Da 5 Bloods	Won	
New York Film Critics Online	2025	Best Supporting Actor	Sinners	Nominated	
North Carolina Film Critics Association	2026	Best Supporting Actor	Sinners	Nominated	
North Texas Film Critics Association	2025	Best Supporting Actor	Sinners	Won	
Online Film Critics Society	2026	Best Supporting Actor	Sinners	Nominated	
Philadelphia Film Critics Circle	2025	Best Supporting Actor	Sinners	Runner-up	
Phoenix Critics Circle	2025	Best Actor in a Supporting Role	Sinners	Nominated	
Portland Critics Association	2025	Best Supporting Performance	Sinners	Won	
Puerto Rico Critics Association	2026	Best Supporting Actor	Sinners	Nominated	
San Diego Film Critics Society	2022	Best Performance by an Ensemble	The Harder They Fall	Nominated	
Santa Barbara International Film Festival	2021	American Riviera Award	Himself	Won	
Satellite Award	1999	Best Actor - Miniseries of Television Movie	Glory & Honor	Won	
Satellite Award	2000	Best Actor - Miniseries of Television Movie	Strange Justice	Nominated	
Satellite Award	2020	Best Actor in a Motion Picture – Drama	Da 5 Bloods	Nominated	
Saturn Awards	2021	Best Actor	Da 5 Bloods	Nominated	
Saturn Awards	2026	Best Supporting Actor	Sinners	Nominated	
Screen Actors Guild Award	1995	Outstanding Cast in a Motion Picture	Get Shorty	Nominated	
Screen Actors Guild Award	1999	Outstanding Cast in a Motion Picture	The Cider House Rules	Nominated	
Screen Actors Guild Award	2020	Outstanding Performance by a Cast in a Motion Picture	Da 5 Bloods	Nominated	
Screen Actors Guild Award	2025	Outstanding Performance by a Cast in a Motion Picture	Sinners	Won	
Tony Awards	1988	Best Featured Actor in a Play	Joe Turner's Come and Gone	Nominated	
Utah Film Critics Association	2026	Best Supporting Performance – Male	Sinners	Won	
UK Film Critics Association	2025	Best Supporting Actor	Sinners	Nominated	
Washington D.C. Area Film Critics Association Awards	2021	Best Ensemble	The Harder They Fall	Nominated	
Washington D.C. Area Film Critics Association Awards	2025	Best Supporting Actor	Sinners	Nominated	
Washington D.C. Area Film Critics Association Awards	2025	Best Ensemble	Sinners	Won	

== See also ==
- African-American Tony nominees and winners
- List of actors with Academy Award nominations
- List of black Academy Award winners and nominees
