= Lucy Ross Henson =

American singer (1879–1968)

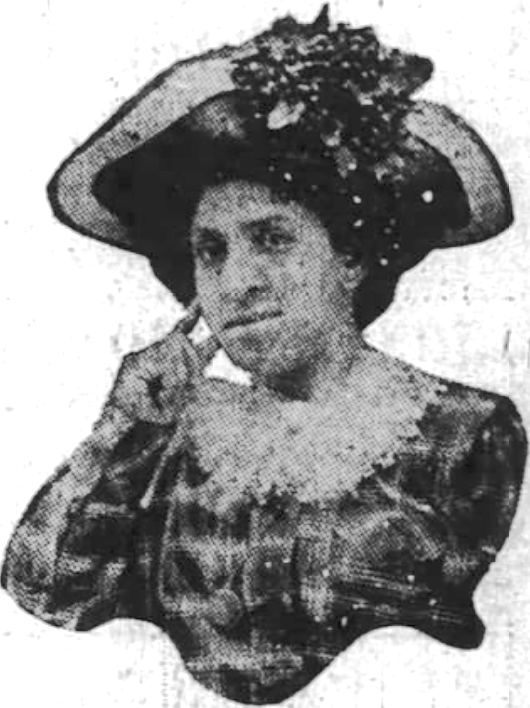
- Lucy Ross Henson, from a 1911 newspaper
- Born: Lucy Ross Henson; June 1879; New York, New York, US
- Died: March 12, 1968 (aged 88)
- Spouse: Matthew Henson

Lucy Jane Ross Henson (June 1879 – March 12, 1968) was an American singer, bank clerk, music director, and clubwoman based in Harlem. Much of her life was occupied as the wife and later the widow of Matthew Henson. She spoke about his work, represented him at events, and preserved his effects.

== Early life ==
Lucy Jane Ross was born in New York City in June 1879, a daughter of Mediator Ross and Susan Randolph.

== Career ==
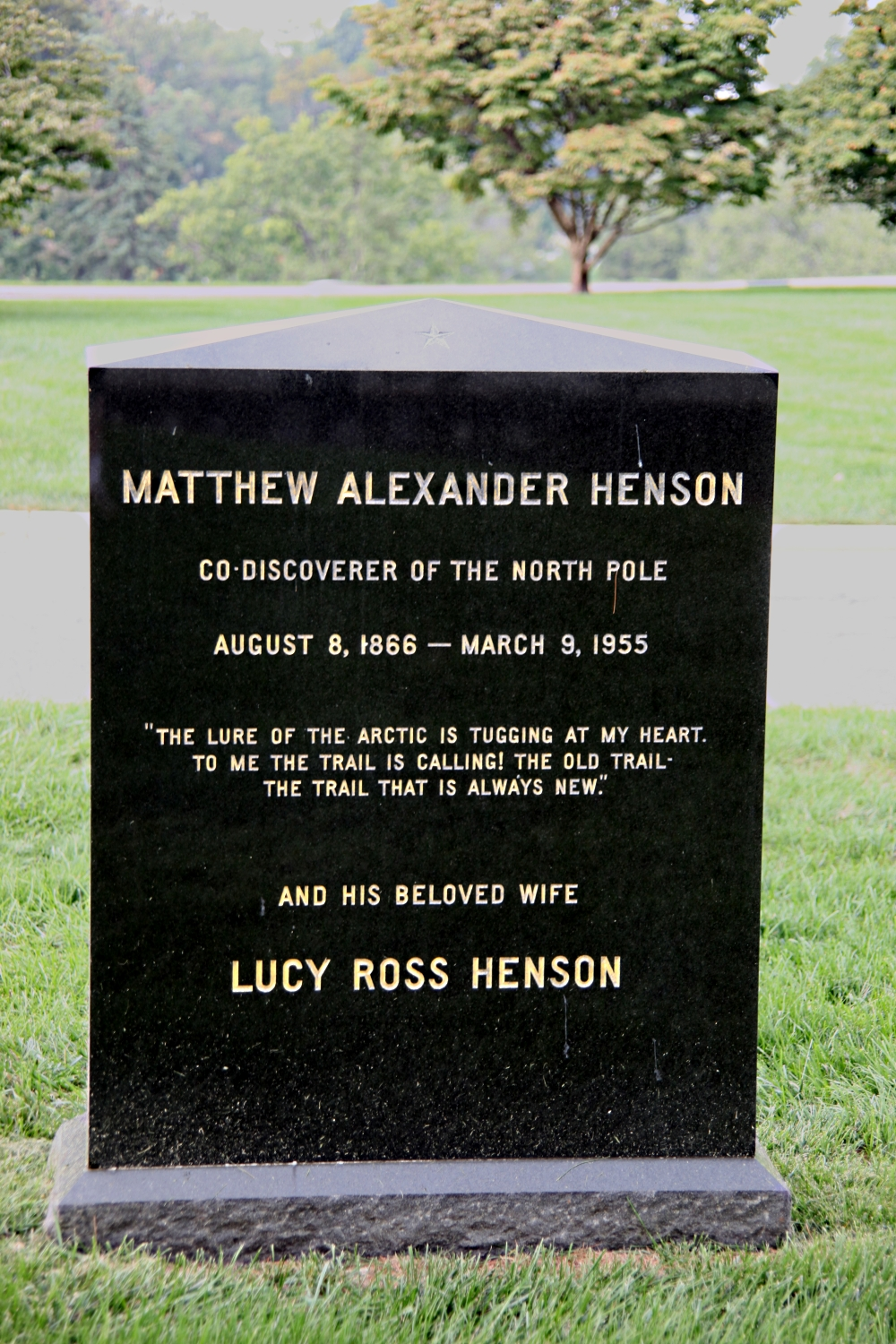
Grave of Matthew Henson and Lucy Ross Henson, at Arlington National Cemetery (2011)

Lucy Henson was a soprano singer known in Baptist women's circles. In 1909, Henson's husband Matthew Henson reached the North Pole with fellow American Robert Peary and four local guides. By the following year, she was already speaking to audiences, resisting the erasure of Henson's role in the expedition. She preserved and collected his Arctic expedition effects, including his knife, ice pick, saw, camera and lantern slides, and donated them to Morgan State University.

Henson was active at the Abyssinian Baptist Church in Harlem for over fifty years. In 1913, she was president of the Church Choirs Club. During World War I, she led a team of Black women war workers at the church. In the 1930s, she was the church's music director. She was vice-president of the Adam Clayton Powell Crusaders Club.

She was the first Black clerk employed at the Manufacturers' Trust Company. She belonged to the Harlem Club, the Negro Business and Professional Women's Club, and The National Council of Negro Women.

In 1954, she visited President Eisenhower with her husband, for the 45th anniversary of the Peary-Henson expedition. In 1959, she attended the unveiling of a commemorative postage stamp marking the 50th anniversary of the expedition, held in Peary's hometown Cresson, Pennsylvania. Later that year, a group of New York City lawmakers, including Adam Clayton Powell Jr., sought to secure a federal pension for Lucy Henson, in consideration of her husband's contributions and her own straitened circumstances.

== Personal life ==
Lucy Ross was the second wife of Matthew Alexander Henson; they married in 1907 when she was 27 years old. He died in 1955. She died in 1968, aged 88 years, at a hospital in New York. Her remains were originally buried in New York's Woodlawn Cemetery; since 1988, her grave is in Arlington National Cemetery.
