= S. Allen Counter =

Neurologist and academic

- Born: Samuel Allen Counter Jr. July 8, 1944; Americus, Georgia, U.S.
- Died: July 12, 2017 (aged 73); Cambridge, Massachusetts, U.S.
- Education: Tennessee State University, Case Western University (PhD), Karolinska Institute (PhD)
- Occupations: Neuroscientist, explorer, university administrator, author
- Years active: 1970–2017
- Employer: Harvard University

Samuel Allen Counter Jr. (July 8, 1944 – July 12, 2017) was a professor of neurology at Harvard Medical School and inaugural director of the Harvard Foundation for Intercultural and Race Relations.

== Early life ==
Samuel Allen Counter Jr. was born in Americus, Georgia. His mother, Anne (née Johnson), was a nurse and his father managed businesses, but died prematurely of a heart attack. Counter grew up in south Florida in the segregated town of Boynton Beach and attended his first civil rights protest as the youngest participant at a "swim-in" at a white-only beach.

Counter studied biology and sensory physiology as an undergraduate at Tennessee State University, then earned his doctorate in electrophysiology from Case Western University. He later earned a PhD from the Karolinska Institute in Sweden.

== Career ==
Counter joined the Harvard faculty in 1970, first serving as a postdoctoral fellow and assistant neurophysiologist at Harvard Medical School and Massachusetts General Hospital. As a neuroscientist, his research focused on nerve, muscle and auditory physiology as well as diagnosis of brain injury. In 1970, the U.S. Secretary of Health, Education and Welfare named Counter to National Institute of Mental Health's National Advisory Mental Health Council.

In 1981 Counter worked with Harvard President Derek Bok, Dean Henry Rosovsky, and Reverend Peter Gomes to create the Harvard Foundation for Intercultural and Race Relations, for which Counter became the founding director. He remained director until his death in 2017.

In addition to his work at Harvard, Counter was also adjunct professor of neuroscience at the Karolinska Institute in Stockholm, and served as Consul General of Sweden in Boston and New England.

Counter was also known for his achievements as an explorer. In 1971, he located a group of people living in the rain forest in northern Brazil, Suriname and French Guiana; the group was descended from African slaves. Suriname was long inhabited by various indigenous people before being invaded and contested by European powers from the 16th century, eventually coming under Dutch rule in the late 17th century. As the chief sugar colony during the Dutch colonial period, it was primarily a plantation economy dependent on African slaves and, following the abolition of slavery in 1863, indentured servants from Asia. Suriname was ruled by the Dutch-chartered company Society of Suriname between 1683 and 1795. In 1986, Counter was approached by an Inuk who claimed, without adducing any evidence, to be the child of Matthew A. Henson who subsequently introduced Counter to another Inuk who claimed, again without evidence, to be the child of Robert E. Peary. Counter was elected to The Explorers Club in 1989.

Samuel Counter also studied mercery poisoning amoung children of gold miners in Nambija, a mining settlement in the Andes of southern Ecuador. In 2003, he and his colleagues found that some of thouse children had blood mercury levels as high as 89 micrograms per litre, compared to a U.S. average of about 0.3, along with slowed nerve responses.

Counter designed Arthur Ashe's memorial at Woodland Cemetery in Richmond, Virginia, dedicated on what would have been Ashe's 50th birthday on July 10, 1993.

== Awards and honors ==
In 2012, Counter was knighted by Carl XVI Gustaf, King of Sweden.

In 2013, Counter was awarded the Explorers Club's Lowell Thomas Award, recognizing "the principle of just dealing and right action in field exploration."

== Works ==
- I Sought My Brother: An Afro-American Reunion with David L. Evans (MIT Press, 1981; accompaniment to 1978 PBS special by Evans and Allen)
- North Pole Legacy: Black, White and Eskimo (University of Massachusetts Press, 1991)
- North Pole Promise: Black, White, and Inuit Friends (Bauhan Publishing, Peterborough, NH, 2017 $19.95 (144p) ISBN 978-087233-246-1)
