= Danny Bonaduce =

American professional wrestler, actor and radio/television personality (born 1959)

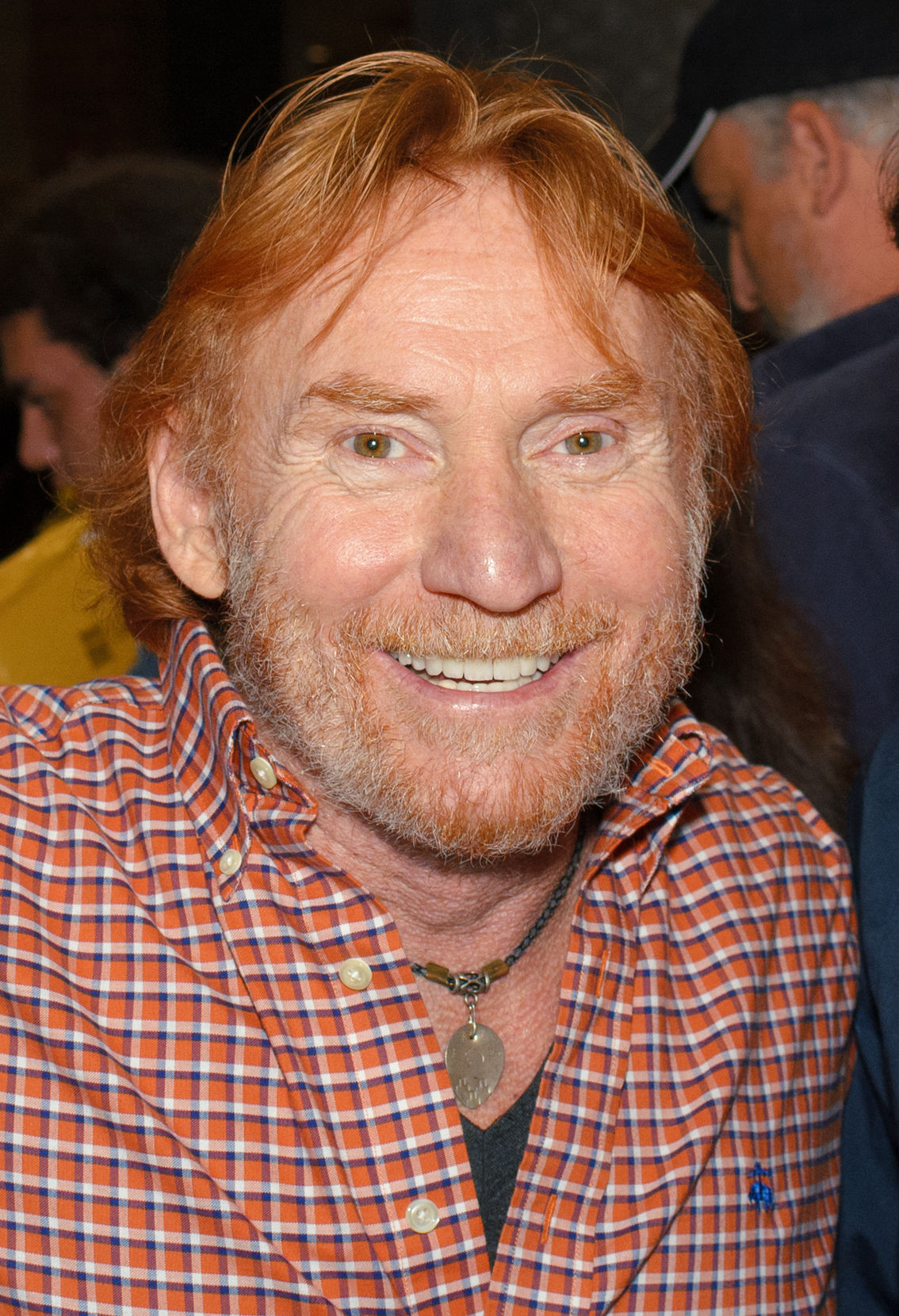
- Bonaduce in 2017
- Born: Dante Daniel Bonaduce; August 13, 1959 (age 67); Broomall, Pennsylvania, U.S.
- Occupations: Actor; radio personality; television personality; professional wrestler
- Years active: 1967–2023
- Known for: The Partridge Family
- Spouses: Setsuko Hattori (m. 1985; div. 1988); Gretchen Hillmer (m. 1990; div. 2007); Amy Railsback (m. 2010)
- Children: 2

Dante Daniel Bonaduce (/ˈbɒnəˈduːtʃiː/; born August 13, 1959) is an American retired radio personality, actor, television personality and professional wrestler. Bonaduce is the son of veteran TV writer and producer Joseph Bonaduce (The Dick Van Dyke Show, That Girl, One Day at a Time and others).

Bonaduce became famous as a child actor of the 1970s on the TV sitcom The Partridge Family. He co-starred as Danny Partridge, the wisecracking, redheaded middle son of the singing family band (headed by Shirley Jones) and he portrayed the fictional pop group's bass guitar player. Since then, Bonaduce has starred in several other TV series, including the VH1 reality show Breaking Bonaduce in 2005, has done radio shows in Los Angeles and Philadelphia and hosted a morning talk/music show at Seattle radio station KZOK-FM from 2011 to 2023.

== Early life ==
By his own account, Bonaduce grew up in a dysfunctional family and suffered severe physical and emotional abuse at the hands of his father, TV writer and producer Joseph Bonaduce. Bonaduce's parents, Joseph and Betty, divorced in 1972.

== Career ==
=== Acting ===
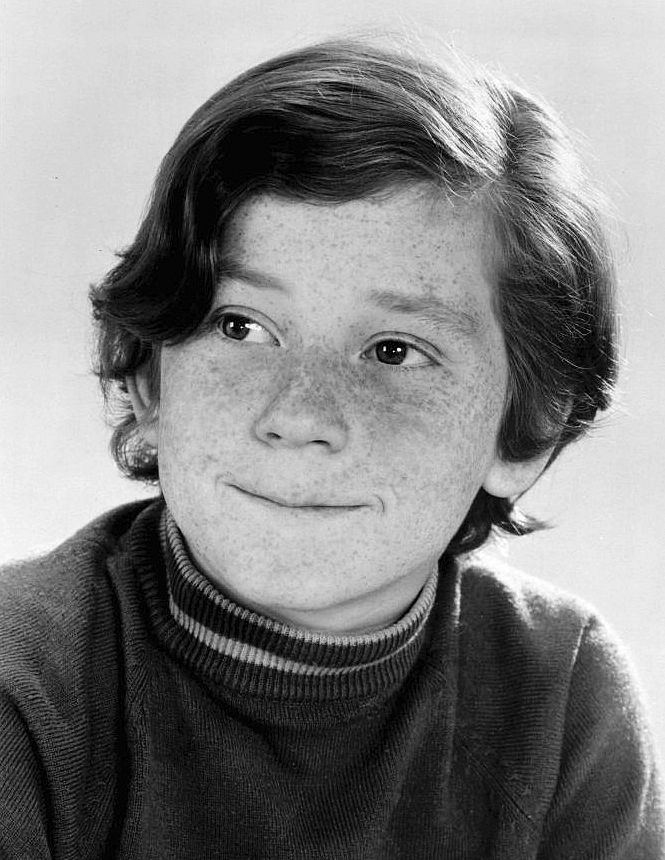
Bonaduce as Danny Partridge on the comedy series The Partridge Family, 1970

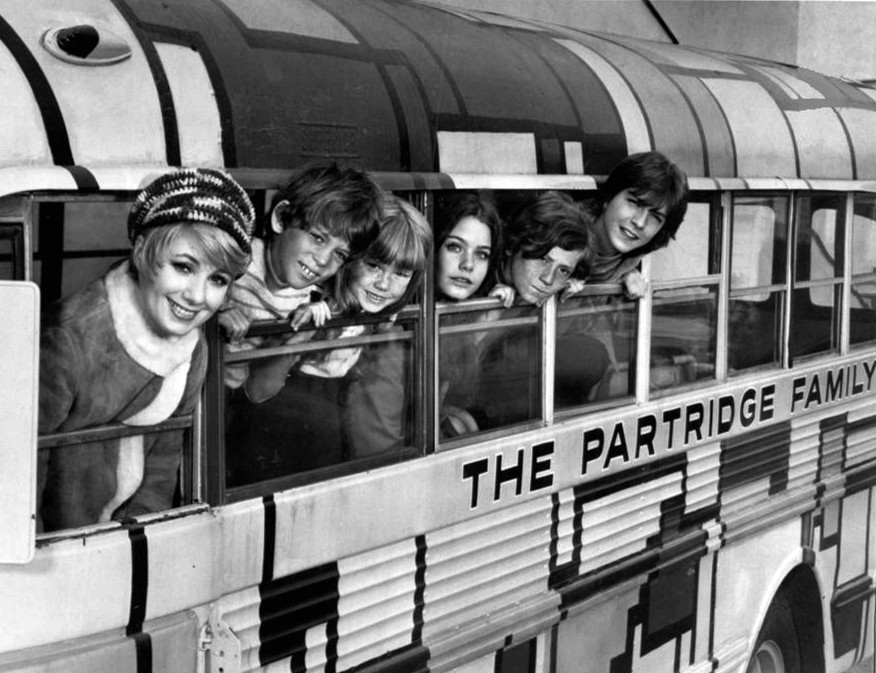
The Partridge Family, season 1. L-R: Shirley Jones, Jeremy Gelbwaks, Suzanne Crough, Susan Dey, Danny Bonaduce and David Cassidy

Bonaduce made a small appearance in the Bewitched season 5 episode "Going Ape", which aired on February 27, 1969, as a young boy in the park whose chimpanzee follows Samantha (Elizabeth Montgomery) and Tabitha (Erin Murphy) home.

Bonaduce had a substantial role on The Ghost & Mrs. Muir on the first-season episode Jonathan Tells It Like It Was, aired March 1, 1969. He played competitor Danny Shoemaker in a history essay contest with Mrs. Muir's son Jonathan. Danny's father Joseph Bonaduce wrote the episode.

In The Partridge Family Bonaduce played the role of Danny Partridge, a member of the musical Partridge family. In the show, the Partridges were a family band that toured the country in their hip, Mondrian-inspired, painted school bus. Danny Partridge played bass guitar for the band and his younger siblings, Tracy and Chris, contributed to the band as percussionists. The series ran for four seasons, from 1970 to 1974. Bonaduce often had trouble memorizing his dialogue from scripts, which David Cassidy revealed in his 1994 memoir.

In 2003, Bonaduce was honored by the Young Artist Foundation with its Former Child Star "Lifetime Achievement" Award for his role on the series. He also voiced Danny in the 1974 Saturday morning cartoon Partridge Family 2200 A.D.

Bonaduce made several movies during and after the run of The Partridge Family, including Corvette Summer (1978) starring Mark Hamill. Hamill and Bonaduce played high school students who went in search of a stolen customized Corvette Stingray. Bonaduce also made guest appearances on several TV shows, including the television action drama CHiPs. His career declined in the early 1980s.

Bonaduce and Partridge Family co-star Dave Madden made cameo appearances in a 1994 episode of Married... with Children. That same year, he appeared on an episode of Space Ghost Coast to Coast. He has also guest-starred in the first two episodes of the seventh season of CSI: Crime Scene Investigation and as the son of Shirley Jones' character in the fourth season of The Drew Carey Show. Bonaduce has appeared as himself on the detective series Monk and on the show Girlfriends. Bonaduce guest-starred with J. D. Roth (with whom he would later reunite for Breaking Bonaduce) on a celebrity episode of Sex Wars. In 1999, Bonaduce appeared in the Christmas episode, "Sabrina, Nipping at Your Nose", of Sabrina, the Teenage Witch.

During his radio work, Bonaduce was the host of the segment "Bonaduce's Buzz" as part of WMAQ-TV's morning newscast First Thing in The Morning with Art Norman and Allison Rosati in 1994; but he left the station the following year to concentrate on his syndicated talk show.

During the 1995–96 TV season, Bonaduce was the host of Danny!, a syndicated talk show featuring the house band The Critics.

From 2001 to 2003, Bonaduce co-hosted The Other Half, a daytime talk show positioned as a complementary show to The View, on which he starred with Mario Lopez, Dick Clark and cosmetic surgeon Dr. Jan Adams (who was later replaced by actor Dorian Gregory). During this time, he was also a Hollywood correspondent for the Australian morning show Today.

In 2005, Bonaduce starred in Breaking Bonaduce a VH1 reality show about his turbulent life with his wife Gretchen.

In 2006, he had a recurring role in the crime scene drama CSI as a character known as Izzy Delancy – a once great, but philandering, rock star, the victim of the infamous miniature killer. He also hosted the short-lived tabloid-themed game show Starface, on Game Show Network. In 2007, Bonaduce was both host and judge of the show I Know My Kid's a Star, a reality show on VH1 featuring parents and children trying to break into show business. He also appeared as a judge on the Australian version of the show, My Kid's a Star.

Bonaduce, admitting his own less-than-stellar track record, was a commentator for TruTV's World's Dumbest... from 2008 to 2013.

=== Radio and music ===
Bonaduce's self-titled debut LP was released in 1973 by Lion Records, a subsidiary label of MGM Records. The single from the album, "Dreamland" was a minor hit.

In the late 1980s, Bonaduce had become an on-air radio personality. He worked an overnight shift at Philadelphia's WEGX-FM. From 1994 to 1996, Bonaduce hosted his own radio show, The Danny Bonaduce Show on The Loop WLUP in Chicago. Between 1996 and 1998, Bonaduce hosted a morning radio show in Detroit on WKQI with comedian and Last Comic Standing winner John Heffron. In 1998 Bonaduce was the morning show host for New York City's Big 105 WBIX for a brief period.

Bonaduce was part of The Adam Carolla Show in 2007. In 2008 he was given a daily one-hour solo spot known as Broadcasting Bonaduce, which was broadcast locally on the L.A.-based KLSX station. In February 2009, it was announced that the station had changed its format from talk to Top 40 and the removal of Broadcasting Bonaduce from the KLSX schedule was confirmed.

Bonaduce is an ordained minister; he was ordained online to perform a wedding ceremony as part of a 94WYSP radio promotion in early 2011.

Bonaduce co-hosted the morning-drive show for Seattle radio station 102.5 KZOK beginning on November 14, 2011. Bonaduce came to Seattle from a radio stint at 94 WYSP in Philadelphia, following a format change from classic rock to all sports radio in September 2011. On April 29, 2022, Bonaduce announced that he was taking a temporary medical leave from his Seattle radio show to pursue treatment for an undisclosed illness. In December 2023, Bonaduce announced that December 15 would be his last day on the air.

=== Altercation with Jonny Fairplay ===
On October 2, 2007, Bonaduce was involved in an altercation with Survivor show participant Jonny Fairplay during the Fox Reality Awards. Toward the end of the awards show, Fairplay appeared onstage and was booed by the audience. Bonaduce walked on stage and explained that the audience reaction was "because they hate you." Bonaduce was walking off the stage as Fairplay called him back. Fairplay then jumped on Bonaduce to hug him and Bonaduce stated later that he was uncomfortable with Fairplay's hands near his throat. Bonaduce, a black belt in Tang Soo Do, adjusted his balance and grip and threw Fairplay over his head. Fairplay fell to the floor, face first, unable to halt his fall with his hands due to the microphone he was holding. Fairplay stood up after a few moments and staggered before slowly walking off stage, his back to the audience. Bonaduce then smiled and proceeded to make faces and exaggerated shrugging motions at the audience before walking off stage.

Bonaduce later said the two had never had any negative interactions before that incident, but that they had met occasionally in the past. He said he had never liked Fairplay, mostly because Fairplay, true to his form, had lied about his grandmother's death during his first run on Survivor. While Bonaduce did not believe Fairplay was significantly hurt at the time, TMZ.com confirmed that Fairplay bled significantly, lost some teeth and suffered a broken toe. Fairplay pressed charges and a felony battery investigation was opened by the police. On October 5, 2007, the L.A. District Attorney's office concluded that there was insufficient evidence to prove Bonaduce had committed battery, because the contact had been initiated by Fairplay and Bonaduce had acted in self-defense.

=== Boxing and wrestling ===
As an adult, Bonaduce boxed Donny Osmond and former Brady Barry Williams in separate charity events. Bonaduce won both fights, gaining a decision over Osmond and a TKO over Williams. On June 11, 2007, it was announced that Bonaduce would box attorney Robert Shapiro for a charitable event.

On September 13, 2008, Bonaduce defeated "Reverend" Bob Levy by a TKO in the second one-minute round of a planned three-round fight. Prior to the event, Levy had slapped Bonaduce while visiting Bonaduce's dressing room.

It was announced in early January 2009 that Bonaduce would box retired baseball player José Canseco at a charity event in the Philadelphia area. Bonaduce reportedly trained for the fight in Sacramento, California with boxer Angelo Núñez. On January 24, 2009, Bonaduce and Canseco fought to a majority draw.

In April 1994, it was announced that Bonaduce would be making his professional wrestling debut in a "dark match" at the Spring Stampede in Chicago. On April 17, 1994, Bonaduce stepped into the ring at the Rosemont Horizon. His opponent was another 1970s TV star, the Brady Bunch's Christopher Knight. Bonaduce won. Bonaduce had his second professional wrestling match at Total Nonstop Action Wrestling's pay-per-view event Lockdown 2009 against Eric Young, which he lost. Bonaduce was a key player in the series Hulk Hogan's Celebrity Championship Wrestling.

=== Writing ===
In 2002, Bonaduce released an autobiography, Random Acts of Badness.

== Personal life ==
Bonaduce has a black belt in karate.

Bonaduce married his first wife, Setsuko Hattori, in 1985 and they divorced in 1988.

On November 4, 1990, Bonaduce met second wife Gretchen Hillmer on a blind date and, on a whim, they married the same day. Despite the unusual start to the marriage, the two remained married for over sixteen years and had two children together. On April 9, 2007, the two divorced, citing irreconcilable differences.

Bonaduce began dating his current wife, Amy Railsback, in April 2007. They met at a Starbucks in the Los Angeles area. Railsback, who is 23 years his junior, is a former substitute school teacher. The couple married on November 22, 2010. They maintain homes in both Seattle and Palm Springs.

Bonaduce and David Cassidy, his The Partridge Family costar, remained close friends until Cassidy's death on November 21, 2017. On January 20, 2018, Bonaduce attended Cassidy's memorial service in Los Angeles. Bonaduce also met actress Shirley Jones on the set of The Partridge Family. Jones often allowed Bonaduce to stay at her home to avoid his difficult home life. According to Jones, Bonaduce was "smart" and "talented" but a troublemaker off-camera, who "was still a kid and would do kid things like get a dish of food and throw it across the room or have a pillow fight". Bonaduce later commented that "Shirley Jones could not have been kinder to me".

=== Arrests ===
On March 9, 1990, he was arrested while attempting to buy cocaine in Daytona Beach, Florida. Bonaduce was there to host an event for D.A.R.E., an anti-drug campaign aimed at children. Bonaduce was eventually fired from WEGX. He later became the morning shift DJ at KKFR-FM in Phoenix, Arizona.

On March 31, 1991, Bonaduce was arrested in Phoenix for beating and robbing Darius Barney, who was described in media as “a transvestite prostitute” whose nose was broken in the incident. Soon after, he was fired from KKFR. In July of the same year, Bonaduce pleaded guilty to reduced charges and was required to pay Barney's medical bills as part of the resolution. Later that same year, Bonaduce returned to WEGX in Philadelphia.

=== Political views ===
Bonaduce has expressed his mostly conservative political views during guest appearances. He is a strong supporter of capital punishment and a strong military. Bonaduce has made several controversial statements regarding left-wing or liberal celebrities, such as saying Jane Fonda should have been executed for treason for her support of North Vietnam during the Vietnam War. He also stated on MSNBC's Scarborough Country that "personally, I think at this point, if anyone had a rope thick enough, I think that Rosie should be strung up for treason", referring to Rosie O'Donnell.

=== Health ===
In June 2023, Bonaduce announced that he would be undergoing hydrocephalus-related surgery after experiencing difficulty walking and maintaining his balance.

== Retirement ==
In December 2023, Bonaduce announced his retirement from Seattle radio and his planned relocation to Palm Springs, California.

== Filmography ==
=== Film ===
Year	Title	Role	Notes
1969	The Fight	George	Short Film
1970	The Wacky Zoo of Morgan City	Boy Feeding the Lion Cub	
1973	Charlotte's Web	Avery Arable (voice)	
1976	Baker's Hawk	Robertson	
1978	Corvette Summer	Kootz	
1978	Born Again	First Male Student	
1979	H.O.T.S.	Richie Walker	
1985	Deadly Intruder	John	
1993	America's Deadliest Home Video	Doug	Direct-to-video; credited as Dante Daniel Bonaduce
2003	Dickie Roberts: Former Child Star	Self	
2005	Lil' Pimp	Ugly Midget (voice)	Direct-to-video
2006	Dr. Dolittle 3	Ranch Steer (voice)	Direct-to-video
2009	PWU: 5th Anniversary Show	Dewey Bonaduce	Direct-to-video
2009	The Jerk Theory	Self	

=== Television ===
Year	Title	Role	Notes
1967	Accidental Family	Danny	Episode: "Halloween's on Us"
1967	The Second Hundred Years	Small Boy	Episode: "Luke's First Christmas"
1969	The Ghost & Mrs. Muir	Danny Shoemaker	Episode: "Jonathan Tells It Like It Was"
1969	Mayberry R.F.D.	Rick / Danny / Boy	3 episodes
1969	Bewitched	Robert / Boy	2 episodes
1969–1970	My World and Welcome to It	Leonard / 2nd Boy	2 episodes
1970	The Good Guys	Stevie	Episode: "Deep Are the Roots"
1970–1974	The Partridge Family	Danny Partridge	Main cast; 96 episodes
1972	Call Holme	Boy	TV movie
1972	Invitation to a March	Cary Brown	TV movie
1973	Goober and the Ghost Chasers	Danny Partridge (voice)	8 episodes
1974	Partridge Family 2200 A.D.	Danny Partridge (voice)	Main cast; 16 episodes
1975	Shazam!	Paul	Episode: "Speak No Evil"
1975	Police Story	Joey	Episode: "The Empty Wagon"
1975	Murder on Flight 502	Millard Kensington	TV movie
1977–1978	Fred Flintstone and Friends	Danny Partridge (voice)	95 episodes
1978	Eight Is Enough	Jimbo O'Hara	Episode: "A Hair of the Dog"
1978	Fantasy Island	Hot Rod	Episode: "Let the Good Times Roll/Nightmare/The Tiger"
1978	CBS Afternoon Playhouse	Sukie	5 episodes
1978–1983	CHiPs	Billy Rogers / Myron Handelbaum / Fred	4 episodes
1979	California Fever	Larry	Episode: "The Good Life"
1988	Rags to Riches	Vince	Episode: "Guess Who's Coming to Slumber?"
1992	The Ben Stiller Show	Self	Episode: "With Dennis Miller"
1994	Married... with Children	Surveyor	Episode: "How Green Was My Apple"
1996–1997	Biography	Narrator (voice)	2 episodes
1996	Boston Common	Gordon	Episode: "The Finals Curtain"
1998	The Drew Carey Show	Chip	Episode: "Drew's Holiday Punch"
1998–2001	That '70s Show	Ricky	2 episodes
1999	Pacific Blue	Johnny Osiris	Episode: "Stargazer"
1999	Diagnosis: Murder	GBS Executive	Episode: "Trash TV: Part 2"
1999	Come On, Get Happy: The Partridge Family Story	Narrator (voice)	TV movie
1999	Sabrina the Teenage Witch	Self	Episode: "Sabrina, Nipping at Your Nose"
2000	The Amanda Show	Blockblister customer/Mr. McOliver	Episodes: Episode 14 and Episode 15
2001–2003	The Other Half	Co-Host	2 episodes; uncredited
2001	The Weakest Link	Himself	Classic TV Stars Edition
2002	Girlfriends	Self	Episode: "Taming of the Realtess"
2002	The Rerun Show	Danny Partridge	Episode: "Diff'rent Strokes: The Rivals/The Partridge Family: Keith and Lauriebelle"
2002	Ozzy & Drix	Smirch (voice)	Episode: "Street Up"
2003	Monk	Self	Episode: "Mr. Monk Meets the Playboy"
2003	Rock Me, Baby	Self	Episode: "A Pain in the Aspen"
2004	The Nanny Reunion: A Nosh to Remember	Himself	TV special guest star
2005	The New Partridge Family	Mr. Partridge	TV movie
2005	Less than Perfect	Ron	Episode: "Playhouse"
2006	CSI: Crime Scene Investigation	Izzy Delancey	3 episodes
2006	Starface	Himself (Host)	Game show
2008	truTV Presents: World's Dumbest...	Self	170 episodes
2009	TNA Xplosion	Self	Episode: "TNA Xplosion #243"
2012	Bigfoot	Harley Anderson	TV movie
2013	The (206)		Episode: "Episode #2.1"
2019	The Kids Are Alright	Boris / Danny Partridge	Episode: "Low Expectations"
2019	How It Really Happened	Himself	Episode: "David Cassidy: Fatal Secret"
