= J. J. Abrams's unrealized projects =

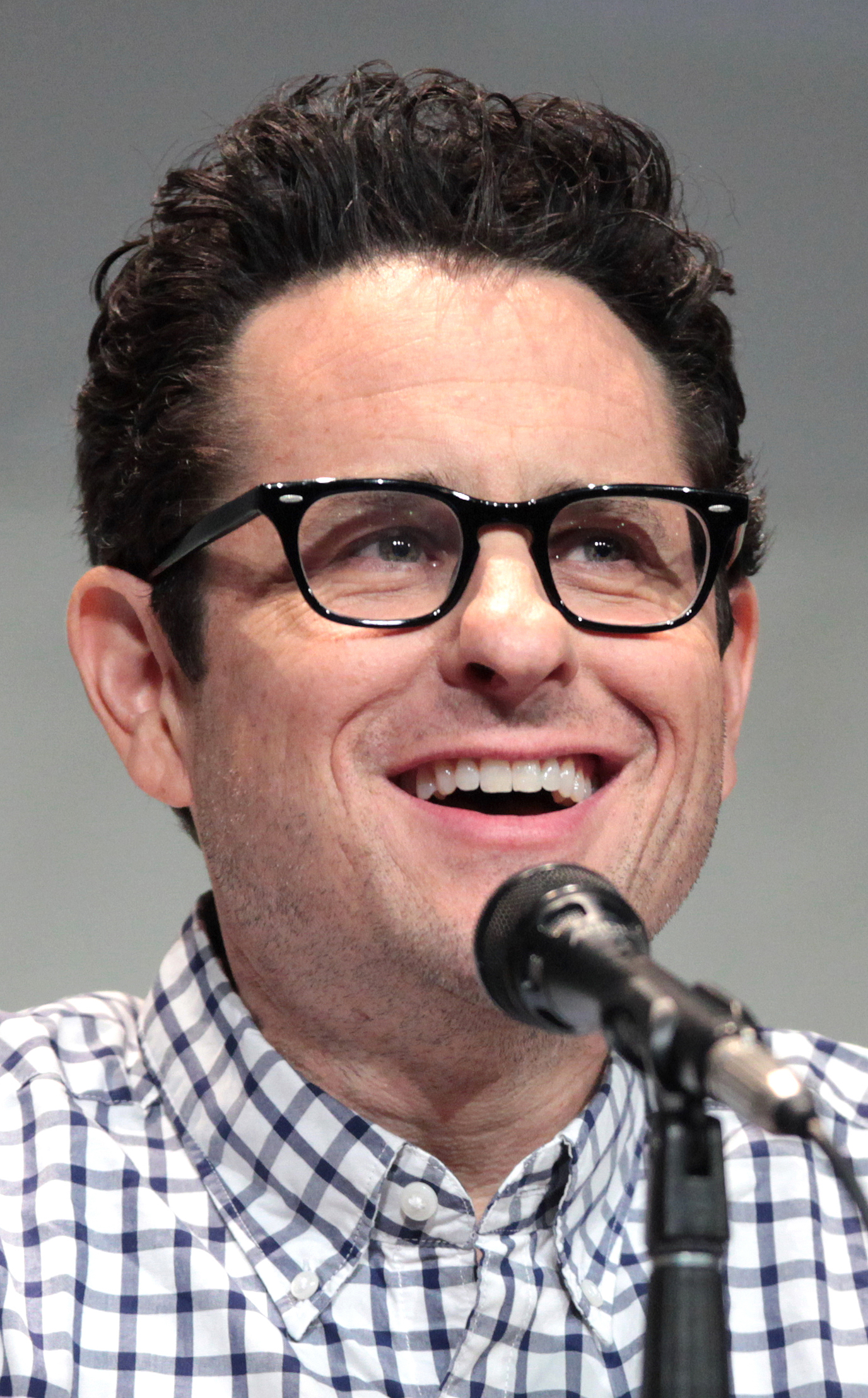
Abrams at the 2015 San Diego Comic-Con

During a career that has spanned over 30 years, J. J. Abrams has worked on projects which never progressed beyond the pre-production stage under his direction.

== 1980s ==
=== Who Framed Roger Rabbit sequel ===
In 1989, Abrams met Steven Spielberg at a film festival, where Spielberg spoke about a possible Who Framed Roger Rabbit sequel, with Abrams as a possible writer and with Robert Zemeckis as producer. Nothing came up from this project, although Abrams has some storyboards for a Roger Rabbit short.

== 1990s ==
=== Speed Racer ===
In 1994, Abrams completed a draft of a script for Warner Bros.' planned live action film adaptation of the 1960s Japanese anime and manga series Speed Racer. Due to an overly high budget, in August 1995, director Julien Temple left the project. The studio considered director Gus Van Sant as a replacement for Temple, though it would not grant writing privileges to Van Sant. In May 2022, Abrams was to serve as executive producer on a new live action television series version of Speed Racer, created by Ron Fitzgerald and Hiram Martinez for Apple TV+. It was reported the series would be based on Abrams' initial script. The project was still under development as of December 2024.

=== The Finding ===
In 1995, a slate of films were reportedly in development for Sydney Pollack's Mirage Enterprises; one of which was an early script co-written by Abrams with Jesse Alexander titled The Finding, for MGM. The project was described as a medical thriller.

=== Beyond Violet ===
In 1997, Variety reported a script written by Abrams based on X: The Man with the X-Ray Eyes was being developed at Warner Bros. with the title of Beyond Violet.

== 2000s ==
=== Superman: Flyby ===
In 2002, Abrams wrote a script for a possible fifth Superman film entitled Superman: Flyby. Brett Ratner and McG entered into talks to direct, although Abrams tried to get the chance to direct his own script. However, the project was finally cancelled in 2004.

=== Hot for Teacher ===
In April 2008, it was reported that Abrams and Bad Robot Productions were producing Jay Dyer's script Hot for Teacher.

=== Mystery on Fifth Avenue ===
In June 2008, it was reported that Abrams purchased the rights to a New York Times article Mystery on Fifth Avenue about the renovation of an 8.5 million dollar co-op, a division of property originally owned by E. F. Hutton & Co. and Marjorie Merriweather Post, for six figures and was developing a film titled Mystery on Fifth Avenue, with Paramount Pictures and Bad Robot Productions, and comedy writers Maya Forbes and Wally Wolodarsky to write the adaptation. According to the article, a wealthy couple Steven B. Klinsky and Maureen Sherry purchased the apartment in 2003 and live there with their four children. Soon after purchasing the apartment, they hired young architectural designer Eric Clough, who devised an elaborately clever "scavenger hunt" built into the apartment that involved dozens of historical figures, a fictional book and a soundtrack, woven throughout the apartment in puzzles, riddles, secret panels, compartments, and hidden codes, without the couple's knowledge. The family didn't discover the embedded mystery until months after moving into the apartment. After Abrams purchased the article, Clough left him an encrypted message in the wall tiles of a Christian Louboutin shoe store he designed in West Hollywood.

=== Untitled earthquake film ===
In August 2008, it was reported that Abrams and screenwriter David Seltzer were working together on a disaster film about an earthquake, for Universal Pictures. Abrams was set to produce with Bryan Burk and Sherryl Clark through Bad Robot.

=== The Untold Story of the World's Biggest Diamond Heist ===
In March 2009, it was reported that Abrams purchased the rights to Joshua Davis's Wired article about the Antwerp diamond heist The Untold Story of the World's Biggest Diamond Heist to produce and possibly direct the feature film adaptation with Paramount Pictures and Bad Robot Productions.

=== Little Darlings remake ===
In April 2009, it was reported that Abrams would produce a remake of the 1980 teen sex drama Little Darlings for Paramount.

=== Men Making Music TV series ===
In April 2009, it was reported that Abrams will produce Men Making Music, a comedy about competitive men's choruses from writer Clay Tarver.

=== Untitled Aline Brosh-McKenna/Simon Kinberg film ===
In October 2009, it was reported that Abrams and Bad Robot Productions were producing a film from writers Aline Brosh McKenna and Simon Kinberg. Since then, there have been no further developments.

=== 500 Rads ===
On November 4, 2009, it was reported that Abrams and Bad Robot Productions would produce 500 Rads, a.k.a. an Absorbed Radiation Dose, from a Jeff Pinkner script. Since then, there have been no further developments.

=== Micronauts ===
On November 6, 2009, it was reported that Abrams and Bad Robot Productions would produce a film based on the Micronauts toy line. On October 23, 2015, Tom Wheeler submitted a Micronauts draft to Paramount and Bad Robot. This iteration of the project is unrelated to the Hasbro Cinematic Universe.

=== Samurai Jack ===
On November 19, 2009, it was reported that Abrams and Bad Robot Productions were producing, along with Cartoon Network Movies, Warner Bros., Frederator Films, and Paramount Pictures, a film adaptation of Samurai Jack. However, in June 2012, series creator Genndy Tartakovsky stated that the production of the film was scrapped after Abrams' departure from the project to direct Star Trek. For this and other reasons, Tartakovsky decided to make a new season instead of a feature film.

=== Let the Great World Spin ===
In December 2009, it was reported that Abrams' Bad Robot Productions and Paramount Pictures were producing the film adaptation of Colum McCann's novel Let the Great World Spin. Since then, there have been no further developments.

== 2010s ==
=== Boilerplate ===
On July 29, 2010, Abrams was announced to be producing the Boilerplate film.

=== 7 Minutes to Heaven ===
In August 2010, Abrams was announced to be producing Jake Bender's 7 Minutes to Heaven film.

=== Zanbato ===
Since 2011, Abrams has been attached to produce the science-fiction action/thriller film titled Zanbato, with Guillermo del Toro officially signing on to direct the project in 2019.

=== Untitled action film ===
In January 2012, Abrams and Matt Reeves were set to produce Michael Gilio's action film with Brad Parker (director of the 2012 film Chernobyl Diaries) on board to direct for Paramount Pictures and Bad Robot.

=== Untitled sci-fi thriller film ===
In May 2012, Abrams was set to produce the sci-fi thriller with Josh Campbell and Matt Stuecken for Paramount Pictures and Bad Robot.

=== Wunderkind ===
In June 2012, Abrams was announced to be producing Patrick Aison's sci-fi action thriller film Wunderkind, for Paramount Pictures and Bad Robot.

=== Collider ===
On July 23, 2012, Abrams was announced to be producing Mark Protosevich's sci-fi film Collider, with Edgar Wright directing for Paramount Pictures and Bad Robot.

=== Earthquake ===
On July 27, 2012, Abrams was set to produce Dustin Lance Black's disaster film Earthquake, for Universal Pictures and Bad Robot.

=== Electropolis TV series ===
In October 2012, Abrams, Bad Robot, Ken Olin and Warner Bros Television were announced to produce the family drama Electropolis, for The CW.

=== Cycle of Lies ===
In January 2013, Paramount Pictures and Abrams and Bryan Burk of Bad Robot were set to produce a film based on Juliet Macur's book Cycle of Lies: The Fall of Lance Armstrong with Bradley Cooper in talks to star as Armstrong, and D. V. DeVincentis writing the script. There have been no further developments since then, with the film likely hindered after The Program was released.

=== Portal and Half-Life ===
In February 2013, Abrams announced at the D.I.C.E. Summit that Bad Robot Productions had made a deal with Valve to produce a film based on either the video game Portal or Half-Life. In 2021, Abrams announced that the Portal movie was still being worked on with a script currently being written, even expressing interest for J. K. Simmons to reprise his role as Cave Johnson from Portal 2. However, he also confirmed that he was no longer currently involved in a Half-Life adaptation.

=== One Last Thing Before I Go ===
In April 2013, Paramount Pictures and Bad Robot partners Abrams and Bryan Burk were announced to be producing the film adaptation of Jonathan Tropper's book One Last Thing Before I Go, with Mike Nichols as director and Tropper writing the script. There have been no further developments since Nichols' death in 2014.

=== The Stops Along the Way TV series ===
In June 2013, Abrams was announced to be producing the series The Stops Along the Way from an abandoned Rod Serling script for Warner Bros Television. There have been no developments since.

=== Untitled sci-fi film ===
In 2014, Abrams and Michael De Luca were announced to be producing Chris Alender's sci-fi film, with Alender directing and co-writing the script with Justin Doble, as a co-production between Columbia Pictures and Bad Robot.

=== Untitled Thomas Edison biopic ===
In February 2015, Abrams was set to produce a biopic about Thomas Edison through Bad Robot, with no word about who will write or direct film.

=== Death of a King TV series ===
In April 2015, Abrams was attached to be executive producer for an adaptation of Tavis Smiley's book 'Death Of A King'.

=== Spyjinx mobile game ===
As of November 2015, a video game called Spyjinx was in development, with Abrams in a collaboration with Bad Robot and Chair Entertainment. A beta test was launched on April 2, 2020, by Epic Games. The beta test ended a year later, and the game was not finished or released.

=== Killers of the Flower Moon ===
In March 2016, Abrams was set to direct the film adaptation of David Grann's Killers of the Flower Moon. In 2021, the book was adapted into a film directed by Martin Scorsese and starring Leonardo DiCaprio, Robert De Niro, Lily Gladstone, and Jesse Plemons.

=== Dream Jumper ===
On April 1, 2016, Abrams was planning on producing the film adaptation of Greg Grunberg's graphic novel Dream Jumper for Paramount Pictures. It is unknown if the project will be live-action or animated and who will write the script.

=== Kolma ===
On April 18, 2016, Abrams was announced to produce Marielle Heller's film Kolma, a remake of the Israeli film All I've Got, with Daisy Ridley in talks to star at Paramount.

=== Beta ===
On June 23, 2016, Abrams was set to produce Ed Solomon's script Beta, which was said to be combine Solomon's comedy with Inception and The Matrix, for Paramount.

=== The Flamingo Affair ===
On June 29, 2016, Abrams was planning on directing and producing the animated film The Flamingo Affair from writer Pamela Pettler for Paramount Animation.

=== Untitled Star Trek film ===
In July 2016, Abrams reported that a fourth alternate universe Star Trek installment was in the works and that he was confident that Chris Pine, Zachary Quinto and Chris Hemsworth would return for the sequel. It was announced in December 2017 that Quentin Tarantino had pitched an idea to Paramount Pictures for a new Star Trek film. A writers room, consisting of Mark L. Smith, Lindsey Beer, Megan Amram and Drew Pearce, was assembled to flesh out the concept. The plan would be for Tarantino to direct the film, with J. J. Abrams onboard to produce. Smith later became the frontrunner to write the screenplay later that month. In May 2019, Tarantino confirmed that his Trek film was still in development, saying "It's a very big possibility. I haven't been dealing with those guys for a while cause I've been making my movie. But we've talked about a story and a script. The script has been written and when I emerge my head like Punxsutawney Phil, post-Once Upon a Time in Hollywood, we'll pick up talking about it again." Tarantino discussed the project in June 2019, stating that Smith had turned in his script, and Tarantino would soon be adding in his notes. He asserted his intention for the film to be rated R. In December 2019, it was reported that Tarantino had left the project, looking to make a smaller budget film. In January 2020, Tarantino stated the film "might" be made, but he would not direct it. As of 2024, due to ongoing internal issues at Paramount, the movie has stayed in the writing queue.

=== The Nix TV series ===
In September 2016, Abrams was planning on directing and producing the series The Nix from author Nathan Hill, with Meryl Streep starring and producing.

=== Glare TV series ===
In December 2016, Abrams was announced to be producing the Javier Gullón sci-fi TV series Glare through Bad Robot for HBO. There have been no developments since.

=== A Woman of No Importance ===
In January 2017,

=== Untitled RuPaul biographical TV series ===
In March 2017, Abrams was producing a TV series based on RuPaul's childhood, with RuPaul co-producing and Gary Lennon writing the Hulu series.

=== The Market TV series ===
In April 2017, Abrams and Jesse Eisenberg were set to produce the comedy The Market, with Eisenberg starring, writing and directing the series.

=== Your Name remake ===
In September 2017, Abrams and Eric Heisserer announced that they were developing a live-action remake of Your Name to be released by Paramount Pictures and Bad Robot in cooperation with Toho, who produced the original film. The latter was to handle the film's distribution in Japan. Abrams and Heisserer were to be the film's producer and screenwriter, respectively. Heisserer stated that the Japanese right holders desired for it to be made from a Western point of view, with a transposition of the film's settings: a Native American woman living in a rural area and a young man from Chicago discovering they are magically and intermittently swapping bodies.

=== Demimonde TV series ===
In February 2018, HBO ordered Abrams' sci-fi drama Demimonde to series. On June 7, 2022, it was announced the project would no longer be moving forward.

=== The Heavy ===
On May 3, 2018, Abrams was announced to be producing Julius Avery's The Heavy with Daniel Casey writing the script for Paramount.

=== Piece of Mind ===
On May 4, 2018, Abrams was announced to be producing Paramount's adaptation of Michelle Adelman's Piece of Mind with Ryan Knighton writing the script and Daisy Ridley set to play Lucy.

=== Aporia ===
On June 4, 2018, Abrams was set to produce the sci-fi film Aporia, with Jared Moshe writing and directing the film. The film was eventually made in 2023, but without the involvement of Abrams or his company.

=== Tab & Tony ===
On June 6, 2018,

=== Reincarnation Type ===
In July 2018, Abrams was announced to be producing Robert Specland's thriller Reincarnation Type and collaborate with Bristol Automotive.

=== A Hope More Powerful Than the Sea ===
In October 2018, Abrams and Steven Spielberg were set to co-produce the film adaptation of Melissa Fleming's A Hope More Powerful than the Sea about Doaa Al Zamel's escape from the Syrian Civil War, with Lena Dunham writing the script.

=== Untitled Ed Hemmings thriller film ===
On November 8, 2018, Abrams was announced to produce Ed Hemming's untitled thriller film pitch.

=== The Steps ===
On November 14, 2018,

=== My Glory Was I Had Such Friends TV series ===
In December 2018, Abrams was set to reunite with Jennifer Garner for a limited series they were executive producing based on the 2017 memoir My Glory Was I Had Such Friends. However, by 2022, it was announced that the project would no longer be moving forward with Apple after Garner exited.

=== They Both Die at the End TV series ===
In February 2019, Bad Robot was announced to be producing the adaptation of Adam Silvera's book They Both Die at the End with Chris Kelly creating the series alongside Abrams, for HBO.

=== Drama Queen TV series ===
In July 2019,

== 2020s ==
=== Overlook TV series ===
In April 2020, Abrams and his production company Bad Robot were announced to be producing Overlook, a prequel to The Shining based on Stephen King's Before the Play, and explore the tales of the Overlook Hotel, for HBO Max. However, in August 2021, it was announced that the show would not go forward at HBO Max.

=== Untitled Justice League Dark TV series ===
Also in April 2020, another series executive produced by Abrams and Ben Stephenson based on the DC Comics characters in the Justice League Dark universe was announced to be in development at HBO Max, alongside Overlook and Duster. By February 2023, it was reported that the series was officially scrapped.

=== Constantine TV series ===
On February 7, 2021, an Abrams-produced HBO Max television series centered on John Constantine and set in the DC Extended Universe, was announced to be in development. By 2022 Constantine, and another Abrams DC Comics adaptation Madame X, were both cancelled.

=== Subject to Change TV series ===
On February 19, 2021,

=== Untitled horror anthology series ===
Also on February 19, 2021, Stephen King revealed that he and Abrams were in talks to collaborate on a possible horror anthology series.

=== Untitled Black-led Superman film ===
In February 26, 2021, Ta-Nehisi Coates was revealed to be writing a new Superman reboot feature for the DCEU that was in early development, with Abrams was set as producer alongside Hannah Minghella. The film was expected to feature a Black actor portraying Superman, with potential for Michael B. Jordan to still take on the role after previously pitching himself as a Black version of the character.

=== Zatanna ===
In March 2021, it was reported that Abrams would produce a big screen, live action feature adaptation of the DC Comics character Zatanna, with Emerald Fennell set to write the script. By 2022, the project was cancelled.

=== Madame X TV series ===
In June 2021,

=== Fledgling TV series ===
In July 2021,

=== Billy Summers TV series ===
In February 2022, it was announced Abrams would serve as executive producer on a limited series adaptation of the Stephen King novel Billy Summers, with Edward Zwick and Marshall Herskovitz writing. One year later, it was announced that Warner Bros. had acquired the project, which was now being repurposed as a feature film with Leonardo DiCaprio's Appian Way Productions joining as a producer.

=== Untitled U2 biographical TV series ===
In March 2022,

=== Untitled Hot Wheels film ===
In April 2022, it was announced that Abrams would produce a live action Hot Wheels film for Mattel Films and Warner Bros. On January 23, 2023, Dalton Leeb and Nicholas Jacobson-Larson were announced to write the film.

=== Constantine sequel ===
In September 2022, Deadline Hollywood reported that Warner Bros. was developing a sequel to the 2005 film Constantine, to be produced by Abrams, Akiva Goldsman and Hannah Minghella. Keanu Reeves was set to return in the lead role, Francis Lawrence was set to return as the film's director, and Goldsman was to write the screenplay.

=== The Pinkerton ===
In January 2023, it was announced that Jason Bateman would direct the supernatural film The Pinkerton for Abrams' Bad Robot and Warner Bros. Pictures, from a spec script by Daniel Casey; Abrams was set to produce the film alongside Hannah Minghella.

=== Emily the Strange ===
In October 2024, it was announced that Abrams' Bad Robot and Warner Bros. Pictures Animation acquired the film rights to Emily the Strange and that the screenplay was being written by Pamela Ribon.

=== Grandgear ===
In November 2024, it was announced that Takashi Yamazaki's first English-language screenplay, Grandgear, had landed at Sony Pictures with Abrams and Glen Zipper planned to produce the film at Bad Robot.
