= Famesick =

2026 memoir by Lena Dunham

Famesick: A Memoir
- Author: Lena Dunham
- Audio read by: Lena Dunham
- Cover artist: Anna Gaskell
- Language: English
- Genre: Memoir
- Publisher: Random House, 4th Estate
- Publication date: April 14, 2026
- Pages: 416
- ISBN: 978-0-593-12932-6

Famesick: A Memoir is a 2026 memoir written by American writer, director, and actress Lena Dunham. Her second memoir after 2014's Not That Kind of Girl, the book covers Dunham's life in the public eye after rising to fame from her semi-autobiographical television series Girls and her coinciding health issues, particularly with endometriosis, Ehlers–Danlos syndrome, and her addictions to opioids and benzodiazepines. The book also covers Dunham's relationships with other high-profile figures, including her ex-boyfriend Jack Antonoff, her former creative collaborator Jenni Konner, and her Girls co-star Adam Driver.

Famesick received largely positive reviews, with many critics highlighting Dunham's sense of humor, her writing abilities, and her uniquely vulnerable writing style, with criticism pointed toward a lack of self-reflection or responsibility taken for the actions she outlines in the book. Following its publication, it topped The New York Times Best Seller list.

== Background and publication history ==
Lena Dunham's first memoir Not That Kind of Girl, a collection of essays about her life, was published in 2014. On September 4, 2025, Random House announced that they would be publishing her second memoir, Famesick, about her rise to fame coinciding with her experiences with chronic illness, in North America. It was also published in the United Kingdom by 4th Estate. The book was released on April 14, 2026. Its cover photograph was taken by photographer Anna Gaskell and based on Alice in Wonderland. The book, which was written over the course of seven years, was inspired by memoirs by Leslie Jamison, Joan Didion, Melissa Febos, and Barbara Gordon. Dunham stated that she wrote the book while listening to music by Taylor Swift, with whom she became a close friend, particularly her albums Evermore and The Tortured Poets Department. In the weeks following its publication, it topped The New York Times Best Seller list as well as best seller lists from USA Today and The Sunday Times; Dunham shared a video to her Instagram account of herself crying after receiving the news.

== Plot overview ==
Famesick is split into three parts—"I'm Not a Girl", "Not Yet a Woman", and "All I Need Is Time"—each taking their name from the lyrics of the 2001 Britney Spears single "I'm Not a Girl, Not Yet a Woman". Each of its chapter names are taken from episode titles of Dunham's television series Girls.

Famesick begins with Dunham discussing her beginnings as a filmmaker: her first short film while on summer break from Oberlin College, which was screened at the Slamdance Film Festival, where she came to know the Safdie brothers; the making of her webseries Delusional Downtown Divas, during which she shared an office space with director Greta Gerwig; and how, after reading journals written by her mother, Laurie Simmons, in her early 20s, she convinced her to star in her semi-autobiographical film Tiny Furniture, which was filmed in the family's Tribeca apartment and brought Dunham to wider success. She also describes her relationship with a sexually aggressive man with a cleft lip, to whom she refers simply as "Lip", who was used as the basis for the relationship in the film. She goes on to describe her pitch to HBO for the series that would eventually become Girls as "the phase before" being a woman in New York City as it was depicted in Sex and the City. The show is cast in six weeks and HBO assigns Jenni Konner, who would later become her creative partner and best friend, as her supervisor. Adam Driver is cast as Adam, a character directly inspired by Lip, and is described by Dunham as unpredictable and emotionally volatile, such as when Dunham has a dissociative episode while rehearsing with him and she forgets her lines, to which he responds by shouting, "Fucking say something," and throws a chair at the wall next to her. However, she also describes him as "protective, loving even" and details their flirtation while he was in a relationship. After the show finished filming, according to Dunham, the two never spoke again.

One week before the premiere of Girls, Dunham starts dating singer-songwriter Jack Antonoff after being recommended to him by his sister, designer Rachel Antonoff. Two years later, they move into an apartment together, though their relationship becomes more complicated as Dunham's health and drug issues mount and Antonoff becomes closer with singer Lorde, only identified in the book as a "teen pop star", in ways that make Dunham uncomfortable. A viral PowerPoint presentation alleging that Lorde and Antonoff were having an affair makes Dunham more wary of their connection. During a break in their relationship, Dunham begins having an affair with a man named Nick, a drug addict with whom she frequently does drugs until going to rehab and breaking up with him. Dunham also characterizes her friendship with Konner as largely unhealthy, such as after Dunham opens up to her about developing an eating disorder soon after moving to Hollywood and Konner tells her that she needs to "just put food in your mouth" to gain weight as Girls is "not funny if you're too thin". After Dunham has a hysterectomy, Konner calls her mother to say she believed Dunham was "clinging to this random diagnosis like it's an answer". After Dunham schedules a therapy session between the two of them, Konner asks her not to write about their friendship immediately and leaves three minutes into the session. The two would not see each other again.

Famesick covers Dunham's numerous health issues, beginning with her getting colitis several weeks before Girls began filming. She was diagnosed with endometriosis, which led to chronic pain, and got her first surgery for it in 2014. When the medication fails to help with the pain, she begins taking a drug which suppresses estrogen production. After regularly taking Klonopin on and off for several years, she describes developing an addiction to it starting in 2016 after her psychopharmacologist prescribes it to her four times a day. In 2018, her rheumatologist informs her that she is taking the FDA's daily limit for the drug and she soon starts attending a rehab facility in upstate New York.

== Reception ==
Critics praised Famesick for Dunham's writing skills, her humor, and the honesty and intimacy of her writing style. For The Guardian, Hannah J. Davies wrote that Famesick was an "undeniably frank and exhaustive" book whose writing had "an honesty and a fluency" that "makes [Dunham] hard to dismiss". Scaachi Koul, writing for Slate, described Famesick as "an ideal celebrity memoir" that "name-drop[s] just enough ... to keep you drooling for more", praising it as "a shocking and funny read, clear-eyed and contextualized, a testament to what made her so interesting in the first place". Publishers Weekly praised Dunham's "self-deprecating humor and penchant for gossipy anecdotes" for "provid[ing] crucial counterweight" to the book's "heavy" topics. For The Independent, Annabel Nugent wrote that Dunham was "as funny and besotted an observer of life as ever" in Famesick, which she called "uncharacteristic[ally] ... unfiltered" for a memoir.

Kaitlyn Greenidge, who had worked for Lenny Letter during the latter years of Girls, praised Famesick for Harper's Bazaar for its "beautiful" and "seductive" sentences and its often "piercing" insight. Sophie Gilbert of The Atlantic praised the book as a "riveting" and "fascinating shift from ... Not That Kind of Girl", calling Dunham "among our funniest living writers" and praising her name-dropping as "bold-faced and braggadocious". For The New Statesman, Kate Mossman wrote that Famesick made it "a little easier to get a grip" on Dunham's "brilliant but exhausting" personality, features "elegant put-downs", and offers "a rare analysis of the process of making art". In a mostly negative review of the book, Defector's Alex Sujong Laughlin wrote that it still featured "a few glancing moments of lucidity", which she described as "glimpses of what has made Dunham's work ... so compelling and frustrating at once". Writing for The Washington Post, Ashley Fetters Maloy described Famesick as "largely breezy and entertaining, with funny little bons mots ... and tidbits of celebrity trivia". For The Forward, Mira Fox praised the parts of the book written about Dunham's parents, writing that her observations about her mother were "funny, yet full of pathos, Dunham at her best".

However, critics also criticized Dunham's lack of self-reflection and accountability for the actions she describes in the memoir. Davies wrote that the book was "scattergun and sometimes lacking in self-awareness" and that it was not "always easy to feel sorry for [Dunham]" due to her "questionable" decision-making skills and "weighty" name-dropping. Greenidge wrote that Dunham's emotions and motivations go underexplored in the memoir and that, despite readers' desires for a mea culpa from Dunham, she "seems to absolve herself of so much responsibility [for her actions] through assuming the pose of the very young girl". Sujong Laughlin called Famesick a "granular" and "exhausting" memoir with "undisciplined" writing, in which she "conveniently" portrays herself as "the victim in the dissolution of her closest relationships". Fetters Maloy also wrote that Dunham's attestation of being a people pleaser made her "squint a little" due to the book "divulg[ing] the granular, gruesome details of every relationship that's gone sour" and "re-airing all [the] dirty laundry" of the friends she lost. Writing for The Mirror US, Julianna Salinas wrote that Famesick had "the stink of a deep-seated victim complex", "little to no self-reflection", and "an astonishing lack of accountability". Fox wrote, "While Dunham is good at pinpointing her flaws, and they are many, she is not always good at reflecting on them, on where they come from or how to change."
