= Lena Dunham =

American writer and actress (born 1986)

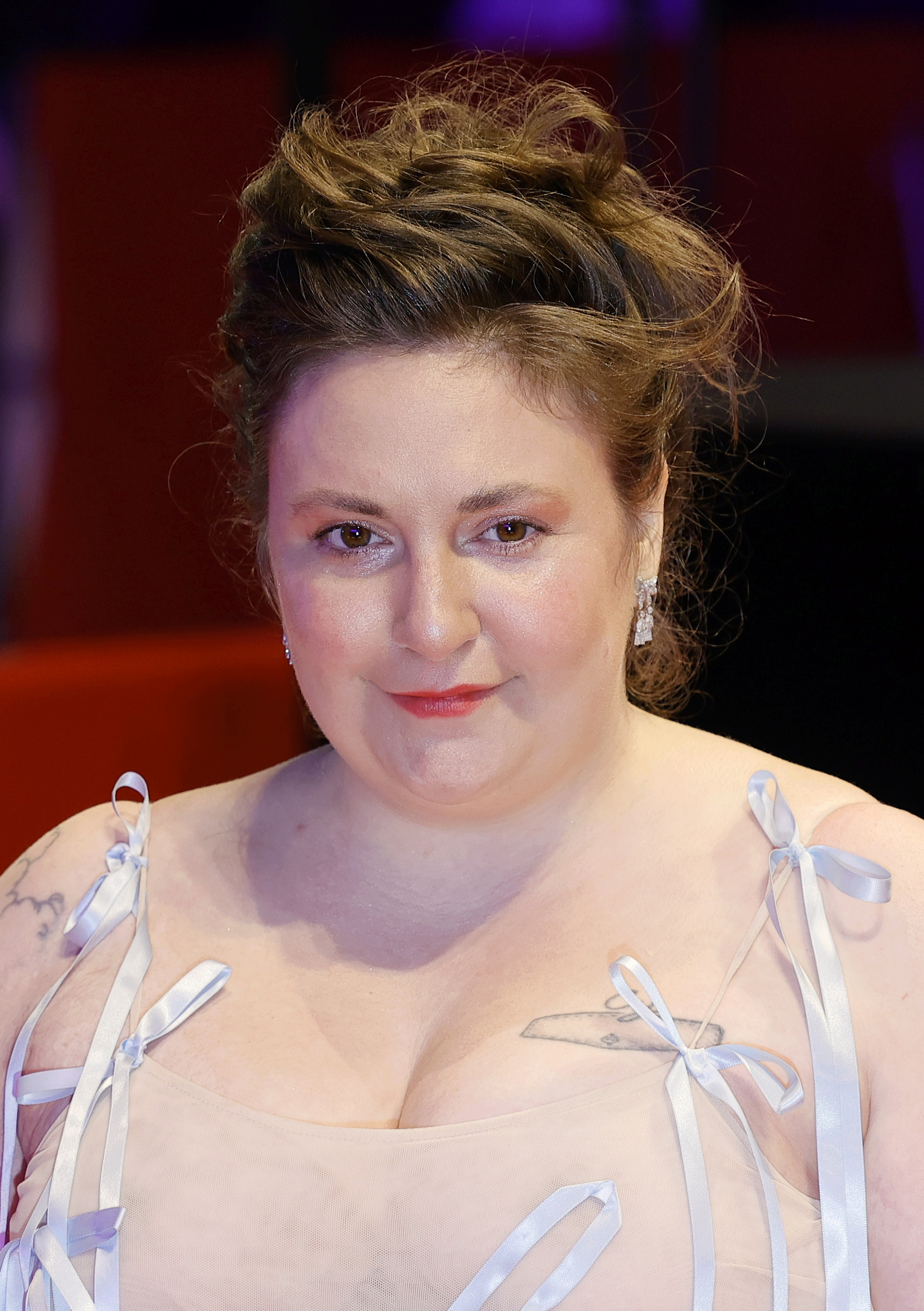
- Dunham in 2024
- Born: May 13, 1986 (age 40); New York City, New York, U.S.
- Education: The New School; Oberlin College (BA)
- Occupations: Writer; director; actress; producer
- Years active: 2006–present
- Spouse: Luis Felber (m. 2021)
- Children: 1
- Parents: Carroll Dunham (father); Laurie Simmons (mother)
- Relatives: Cyrus Grace Dunham (sibling)

Lena Dunham (/ˈliːnə ˈdʌnəm/; born May 13, 1986) is an American writer, director, actress, and producer. She is the creator, writer, and star of the HBO television series Girls (2012–2017), for which she received several Emmy Award nominations and two Golden Globe Awards. Dunham also directed several episodes of Girls and became the first woman to win the Directors Guild of America Award for Outstanding Directing – Comedy Series. She started her career writing, directing, and starring in her semi-autobiographical independent film Tiny Furniture (2010), for which she won an Independent Spirit Award for Best First Screenplay. She has since written and directed the 2022 films Sharp Stick and Catherine Called Birdy. In 2025, she created the Netflix series Too Much starring Megan Stalter.

In 2013, Dunham was included in the annual Time 100 list of the most influential people in the world. In 2014, Dunham released her first book, Not That Kind of Girl: A Young Woman Tells You What She's "Learned". In 2015, along with Girls showrunner Jenni Konner, Dunham created the publication Lenny Letter, a feminist online newsletter. The publication ran for three years before its discontinuation in late 2018. Her second memoir, Famesick, was released in 2026 and topped The New York Times Best Seller list.

Dunham briefly appeared in films such as Supporting Characters and This Is 40 (both 2012), and Happy Christmas (2014). She voiced Mary in the 2016 film My Entire High School Sinking Into the Sea, which premiered at the Toronto International Film Festival. On television, aside from Girls, she has played guest roles in Scandal and The Simpsons (both 2015). In 2017, she portrayed Valerie Solanas in American Horror Story: Cult.

Dunham's work, as well as her outspoken presence on social media and in interviews, have attracted significant controversy, praise, criticism, and media scrutiny throughout her career.

== Early life and education ==
Dunham was born in New York City. Her father, Carroll Dunham, is a painter, an atheist of mostly English Presbyterian ancestry and a descendant of Stephanus van Cortlandt (1643–1700), the first native-born mayor of New York City. Dunham's mother, Laurie Simmons, is an artist and photographer from Long Island. She is a member of The Pictures Generation, known for her use of dolls and dollhouse furniture in her photographs of setup interior scenes. Her mother is Jewish with family from Poland. Dunham has described herself as feeling "very culturally Jewish, although that's the biggest cliché for a Jewish woman to say." The Modern Hebrew poetry of Yehuda Amichai helped her to connect with her Judaism.

Dunham attended Friends Seminary before transferring in seventh grade to Saint Ann's School in Brooklyn, where she met Tiny Furniture actress and future Girls co-star Jemima Kirke. As a teen, Dunham also won a Scholastic Art and Writing Award. She attended The New School for a year before transferring to Oberlin College, where she graduated in 2008 with a degree in creative writing. During a summer in college, Dunham took a trip to Poland to reconnect with her Jewish roots.

She has a younger sibling, Cyrus, who appeared in Dunham's first film, Creative Nonfiction, and starred in her second film, Tiny Furniture. The siblings were raised in Brooklyn and spent summers in Salisbury, Connecticut.

== Career ==
=== 2000s: Oberlin College and early works ===
While a student at Oberlin College, Dunham produced several independent short films and uploaded them to YouTube. Many of her early films dealt with themes of sexual enlightenment and were produced in a mumblecore filmmaking style, a dialogue-heavy style in which young people talk about their personal relationships. In 2006, she produced Pressure, in which a girl and two friends talk about experiencing an orgasm for the first time, which makes Dunham's character feel pressured to do so as well. "I didn't go to film school", Dunham explains. "Instead I went to liberal arts school and self-imposed a curriculum of creating tiny flawed video sketches, brief meditations on comic conundrums, and slapping them on the Internet."

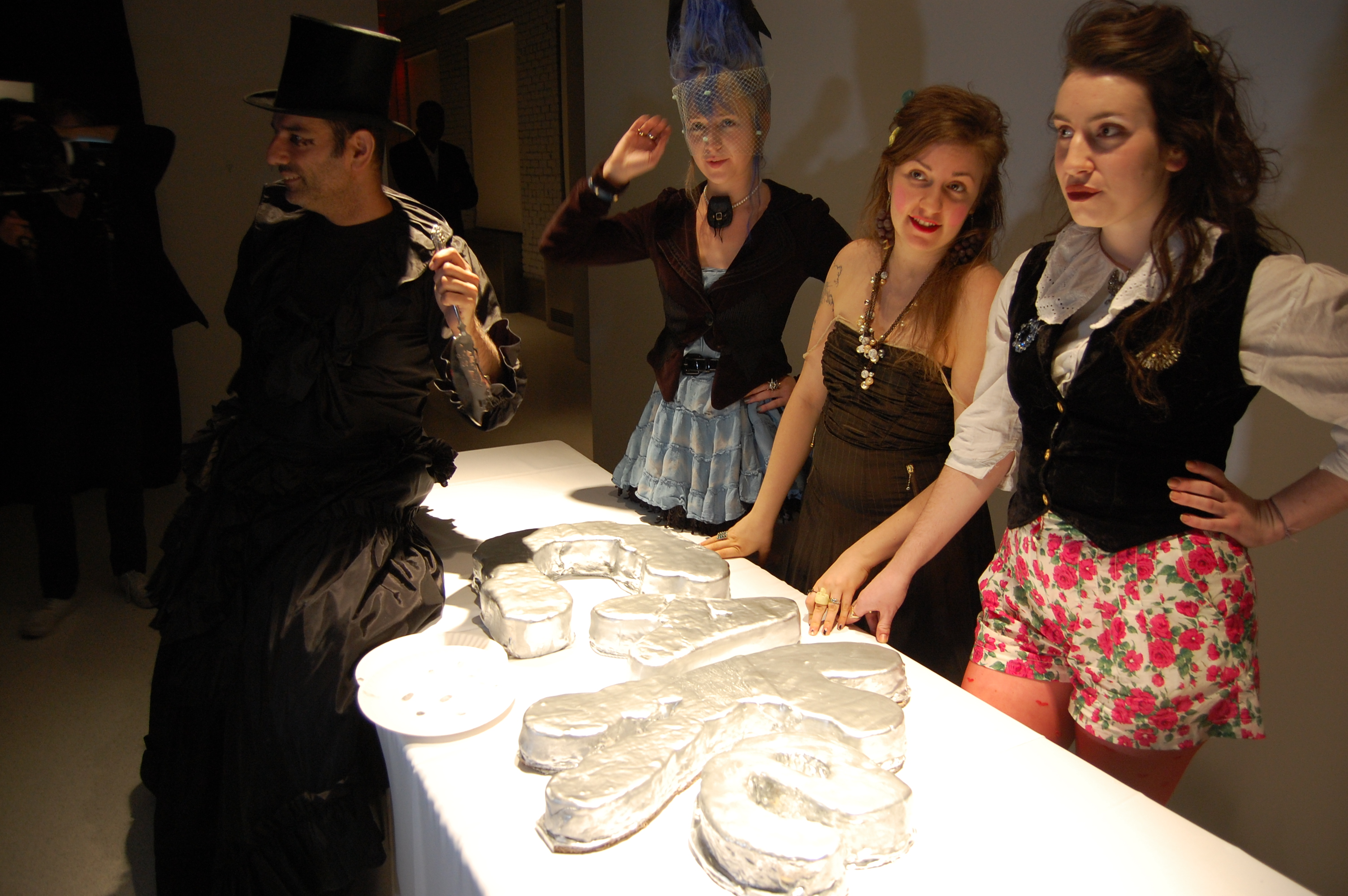
Dunham on the set of her web series Delusional Downtown Divas (2009)

Another early film, entitled The Fountain, which depicted her in a bikini brushing her teeth in the public fountain at Oberlin College, went viral on YouTube. "Her blithe willingness to disrobe without shame caused an outburst of censure from viewers," observed The New Yorker's Rebecca Mead. Dunham was shocked by the backlash and decided to take the video down:

There were just pages of YouTube comments about how fat I was, or how not fat I was," Dunham said. "I didn't want you to Google me and the first thing you see is a debate about whether my breasts are misshapen."

Pressures (2006), Open the Door (2007), Hooker on Campus (2007), and The Fountain (2007) were released as DVD extras with Tiny Furniture. In 2007, Dunham starred in a ten-episode web series for Nerve.com entitled Tight Shots, described by The New York Times Magazine's Virginia Heffernan as "a daffy serial about kids trying to make a movie and be[ing] artsy and hav[ing] tons of sex."

In 2009, Dunham created the Index Magazine web series, Delusional Downtown Divas, which satirized the New York City art scene. The production was unpaid, so Dunham and her friends "pooled their money from babysitting and art-assistant gigs and borrowed some camera gear." Also in 2009, Dunham premiered Creative Nonfiction — a comedy where she plays Ella, a college student struggling to complete a screenplay — at the South by Southwest Festival in Austin, Texas. She was initially rejected by the festival the year before; she re-edited and successfully resubmitted the film.

=== 2010–11: Breakthrough with Tiny Furniture ===
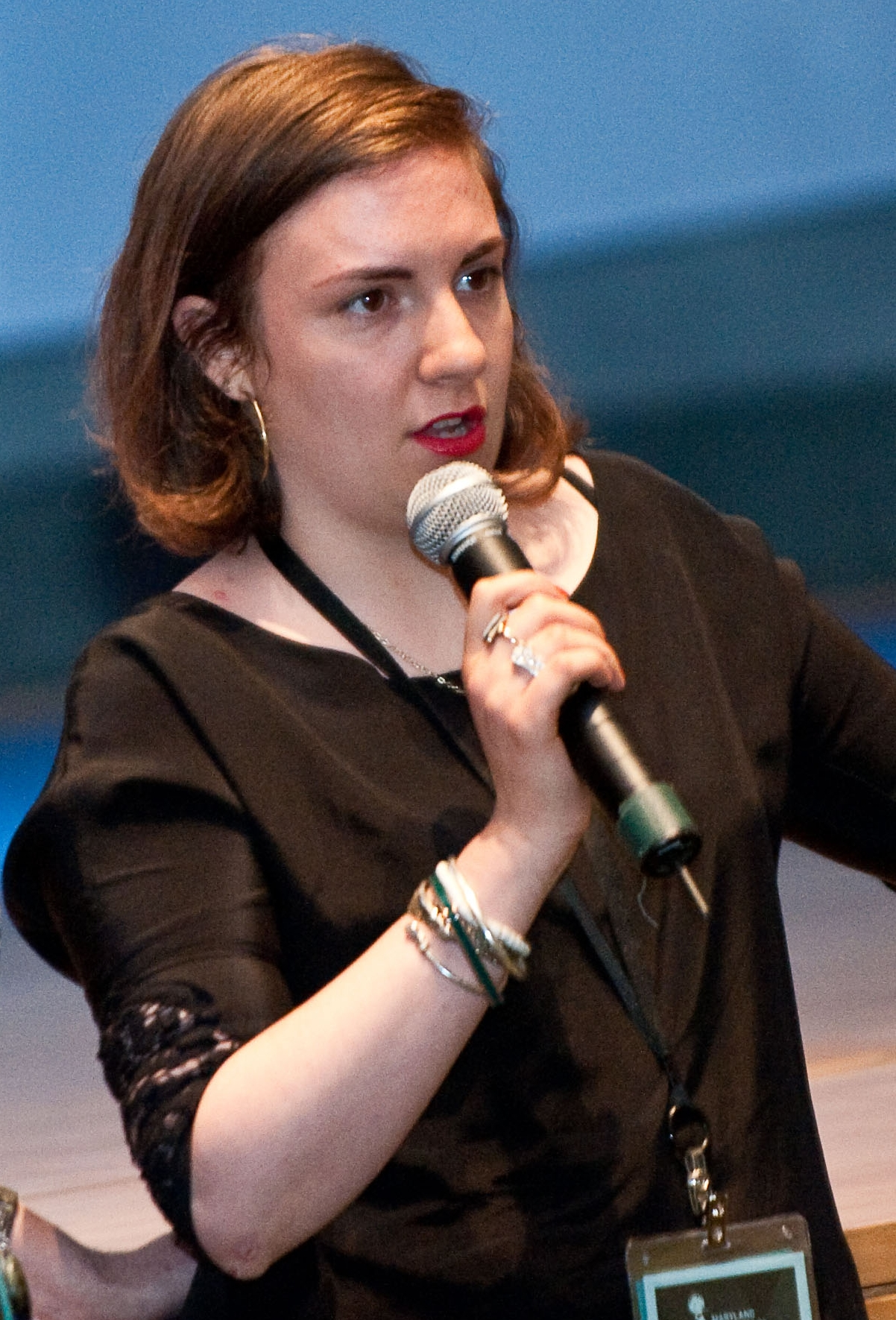
Dunham speaking at the Maryland Film Festival in 2010

Dunham had a career breakthrough with her semi-autobiographical 2010 feature film Tiny Furniture; the film won Best Narrative Feature at South by Southwest Music and Media Conference, and subsequently screened at such festivals as Maryland Film Festival. Dunham plays the lead role of Aura. Laurie Simmons (Dunham's real-life mother) plays Aura's mother, and Dunham's real-life sibling Cyrus plays Aura's on-screen sibling. For her work on Tiny Furniture, Dunham also won an Independent Spirit Award for Best First Screenplay.

The success of Tiny Furniture earned Dunham a blind script deal at HBO. The network set Dunham up with veteran showrunner Jennifer Konner. Konner told Vulture's Jada Yuan that she got involved with Dunham because she was an obsessive Tiny Furniture fan:

I got a copy of Tiny Furniture from [HBO president] Sue Naegle. Actually, [New Girl creator] Liz Meriwether told me about it and said, 'Oh, there's this great movie. This girl, she's 23, she wrote, directed, and starred in it; she's in her underwear the whole time.' And I was like, 'I really don't want to see that.' And then she was like, 'Oh, trust me, it's great.' So Sue gave it to me just because she had it ... I used to, like, give out copies of the movie. But I'd just broken up with my writing partner and couldn't be less interested in the idea of supervising anybody. I really was like, 'I'm going to find my voice, and be on my own.' And then they called me and they were like, 'Oh, the Tiny Furniture girl is doing a show, do you want to supervise her?' And I was like, 'Yes! One million percent. Sign me up. Totally on board.'

Dunham's star also rose when she was profiled by David Carr in The New York Times; he was later credited with introducing her to Judd Apatow. Apatow watched Tiny Furniture, and was surprised Dunham had also written and directed the film. "I emailed her and told her I thought it was great", Apatow told The Hollywood Reporter. "It turned out she was in the middle of negotiating a deal to develop a show for HBO and that her partner was Jenni Konner, whom I had worked with on Undeclared and a bunch of other projects. They asked me if I wanted to be a part of it, and I was thrilled to jump in."

=== 2012–17: Mainstream success with Girls and first book ===
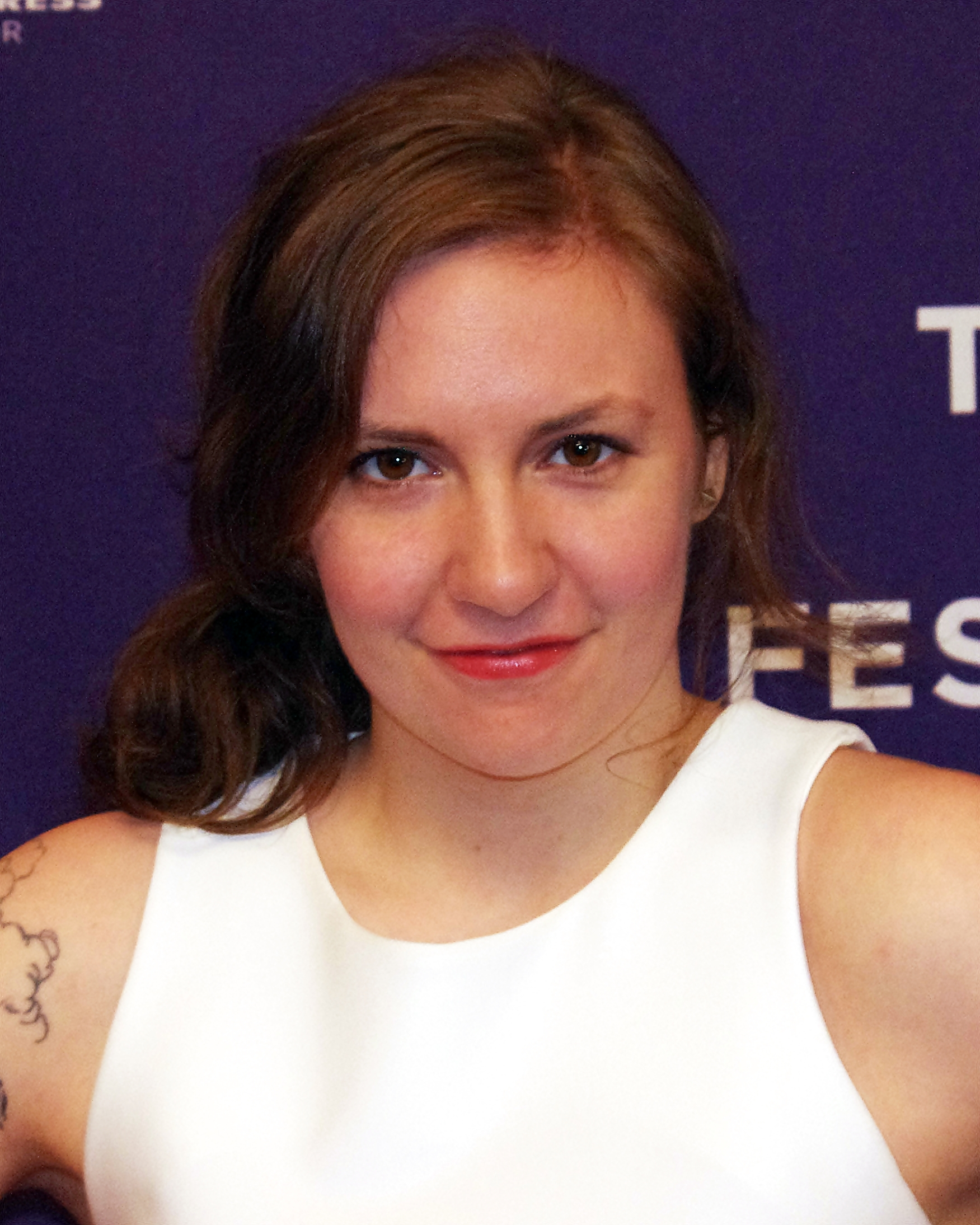
Dunham at the premiere of Supporting Characters at the 2012 Tribeca Film Festival

Dunham's television series, Girls, was greenlit by HBO in early 2011. Three episodes were screened to positive responses at the 2012 South by Southwest Festival. The series follows Hannah Horvath (portrayed by Dunham), a 20-something writer struggling to get by in New York City. Some of the struggles facing Dunham's character Hannah—including being cut off financially from her parents, becoming a writer and making unfortunate decisions—are inspired by Dunham's real-life experiences.

Dunham said Girls reflects a part of the population not portrayed in the 1998 HBO series Sex and the City. "Gossip Girl was teens duking it out on the Upper East Side and Sex and the City was women who [had] figured out work and friends and now want to nail romance and family life. There was this 'hole-in-between' space that hadn't really been addressed," she said. The pilot intentionally references Sex and the City, as producers wanted to make it clear that the driving force behind Girls is that the characters were inspired by the former HBO series and moved to New York to pursue their dreams. Dunham herself says she "revere[s] that show just as much as any girl of my generation".

The first season premiered on HBO on April 15, 2012, and received critical acclaim. The New York Times applauded the series, writing that "Girls may be the millennial generation's rebuttal to Sex and the City, but the first season was at times as cruelly insightful and bleakly funny as Louie on FX or Curb Your Enthusiasm on HBO." James Poniewozik from Time had high praise for the series, calling it "raw, audacious, nuanced and richly, often excruciatingly funny". Despite the acclaim, the series also generated criticism over its lack of racial representation and Dunham's frequent on-screen nudity.

The first season garnered Dunham four Emmy Award nominations for her roles in acting, writing, and directing the series, as well as two Golden Globe Awards for Best Television Series – Musical or Comedy and Best Actress – Television Series Musical or Comedy. In February 2013, Dunham became the first woman to win a Directors Guild of America Award for Outstanding Directing – Comedy Series for her work on Girls.

Girls was renewed for a second season in April 2012, before the first season had finished airing. The first-season finale drew over one million viewers. The second season of Girls continued to receive critical acclaim. David Wiegland of the San Francisco Chronicle said: "The entire constellation of impetuous, ambitious, determined and insecure young urbanites in Girls is realigning in the new season, but at no point in the four episodes sent to critics for review do you feel that any of it is artificial". Verne Gay of Newsday said: "Sharper, smarter, more richly layered, detailed and acted". Ken Tucker of Entertainment Weekly felt that "As bright-eyed and bushy-tailed as it was in its first season, Girls may now be even spunkier, funnier, and riskier". The second season ran on HBO from January 2013 to March 2013, with third and fourth seasons subsequently being renewed. The third season of Girls premiered in January 2014 with over one million viewers. The following month, Dunham hosted an episode of Saturday Night Live with musical guest The National.

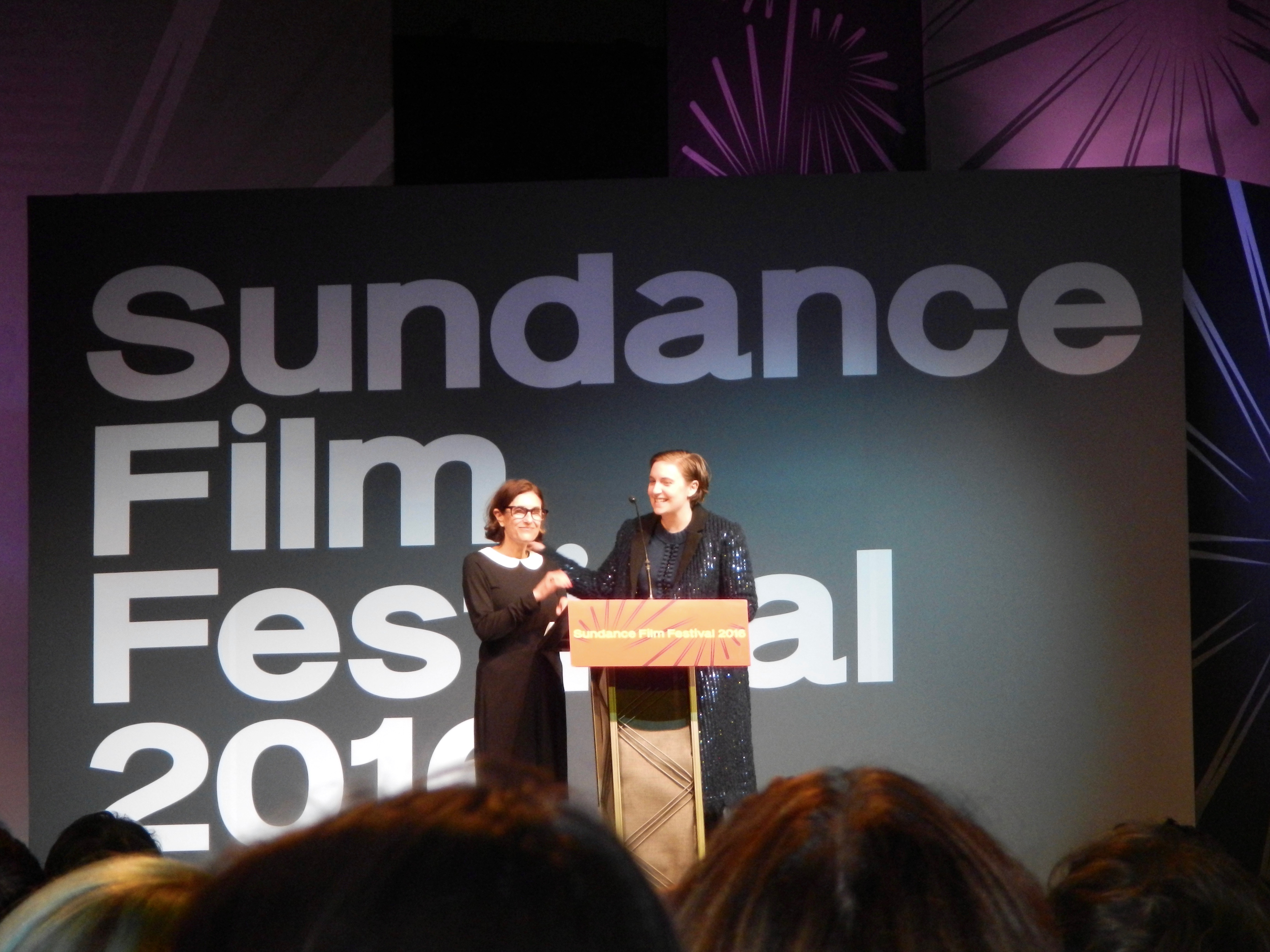
Dunham with Avy Kaufman at the 2016 Sundance Film Festival

In late 2012, Dunham signed a $3.5 million deal with Random House to publish her first book. The book, an essay collection called Not That Kind of Girl: A Young Woman Tells You What She's "Learned", was published in September 2014. It reached number two on The New York Times Best Seller list in October 2014. On September 30, 2014, Dunham did a book signing and interview at Barnes and Noble in New York's Union Square. She was interviewed by Amy Schumer before an audience of eager readers. On January 5, 2015, days before the premiere of the fourth season, Girls was renewed for a fifth season, despite dwindling viewership. That year, Dunham launched A Casual Romance Productions, a production company to develop television and film projects. The company produced It's Me Hilary: The Man Who Drew Eloise. On February 20, 2015, it was reported that Dunham had been cast in a guest role in an episode of the ABC drama series Scandal, which aired March 19, 2015.

In September 2015, Dunham stated that the sixth season of Girls was likely to be the last. This was later confirmed by HBO. In 2016, Dunham appeared in her mother's film, My Art, which had its world premiere at the 73rd Venice International Film Festival. She also voiced Mary in My Entire High School Sinking Into the Sea, a 2016 American animated teen comedy drama film directed by Dash Shaw. It was selected to be screened in the Vanguard section at the 2016 Toronto International Film Festival. Dunham also filmed scenes for the film Neighbors 2: Sorority Rising, but they were cut from the final film. In 2017, Dunham portrayed Valerie Solanas, the real-life radical feminist and SCUM Manifesto author who attempted to murder Andy Warhol in the late 1960s, in American Horror Story: Cult. Girls' sixth and final season concluded on April 16, 2017, leaving a total of 62 episodes in the series.

=== 2018–present: Second book, Camping, and other work ===
In February 2018, A Casual Romance Productions announced that it would be producing Camping, a remake of the British comedy series of the same name for HBO, with Jennifer Garner in the lead and Dunham and Konner as showrunners and writers. On July 25, 2018, the series held a panel at the Television Critics Association's annual summer press tour featuring executive producer Jenni Konner and cast member Jennifer Garner. The following day, a teaser trailer for the series was released. Camping was met with a mixed to negative response from critics upon its premiere. On the review aggregation website Rotten Tomatoes, the first season holds a 28% approval rating, with an average rating of 5.1 out of 10 based on 32 reviews. The website's critical consensus was: "The first season of Camping makes it difficult to determine who the least happy campers are: those on the screen or those watching it." Metacritic, which uses a weighted average, assigned the season a score of 49 out of 100 based on 26 critics, indicating "mixed or average reviews".

In August 2018, it was announced Dunham would appear in the film Once Upon a Time in Hollywood, directed by Quentin Tarantino, which released on July 26, 2019. Dunham portrayed the role of Catherine "Gypsy" Share. In October 2018, coinciding with the expiration of their joint HBO contract, Dunham and Konner split as producing partners and dissolved their production company.

In October 2018, Dunham was hired to write the screenplay for an untitled film based upon the memoir A Hope More Powerful Than the Sea: One Refugee's Incredible Story of Love, Loss, and Survival, by Melissa Fleming, about the true story of Doaa Al Zamel, who fled Egypt for Europe and became one of the few survivors of a shipwrecked refugee boat. Some columnists felt that, instead of Dunham, a Syrian woman should have been hired. Author Melissa Fleming supported the choice of Dunham as script writer.

In 2019, Dunham and Alissa Bennett started a podcast called The C-Word Podcast produced by Luminary. Dunham launched a new production company named Good Thing Going the same year, which had a first look deal with HBO.

In response to the 2020 coronavirus pandemic, in March 2020 Dunham announced she would write a serialized novel, Verified Strangers, as a response to social isolation. She added that the act was a response to help herself and the readers in a time of anxiety. The serialization started later that month on the Vogue website. Dunham directed and served as an executive producer on the first episode of HBO's Industry. That same year, she appeared in The Stand In directed by Jamie Babbit. In 2021, Dunham had a small role in Music, directed by Sia. She also served as an executive producer on Generation, a dramedy for HBO Max.

In 2022, Dunham's second feature film, Sharp Stick, starring Kristine Froseth, Dunham, and Jon Bernthal, was released to mixed reviews. She also directed, wrote, and produced her third film, Catherine Called Birdy, an adaption of the children's novel of the same name by Karen Cushman for Working Title Films. The film had its world premiere at the Toronto International Film Festival on September 12, 2022. It was released in a limited release on September 23, 2022, by Amazon Studios, prior to streaming on Prime Video on October 7, 2022. In December 2023, Netflix announced that Too Much, a new series co-created, written, executive produced, and directed by Dunham, would enter production the following year in the United Kingdom.

In July 2025, Dunham and her husband Luis Felber created and released the Netflix series romantic comedy television series Too Much starring Megan Stalter and Will Sharp under the Working Title Television and Dunham's company Good Thing Going. Dunham directed, produced and wrote the series and received positive reviews from critics. After the release of the show in September, Dunham announced her second memoir Famesick which was published on April 14, 2026, just one month before Dunham's much-hyped 40th birthday.

On January 20, 2026, Dunham moderated the launch event for Jennette McCurdy's debut novel, Half His Age, at The Town Hall in NYC.

== In the media ==
Dunham has appeared on several magazine covers, including Vogue, Elle, Marie Claire, Popular Mechanics, and Rolling Stone. After Dunham posed with bare legs for Glamour's February 2017 cover, she praised the magazine for featuring an unedited photo and leaving the cellulite on her thighs visible.

=== Lenny Letter ===
In 2015, Dunham and Jenni Konner co-founded Lenny Letter, a feminist online newsletter. Lenny Letter was initially supported by Hearst Corporation advertising, and subsequently by Condé Nast. In addition to the regular newsletter, Lenny Letter published a fiction issue and a poetry issue in late 2015. Articles include an essay written by actress Jennifer Lawrence about the gender wage gap in Hollywood, and one written by singer Alicia Keys about her decision to start wearing little to no make-up.

In November 2017, following Dunham and Konner's letter denouncing Aurora Perrineau's accusation of sexual assault by Murray Miller, Zinzi Clemmons announced that she would no longer contribute to the newsletter because she felt Dunham was insufficiently sympathetic to women of color.

In October 2018, Dunham and Konner announced that Lenny Letter would be shutting down, reportedly due to a decline in subscribers and failure to build momentum upon other platforms.

=== Orgasm Inc ===
Dunham has been criticized for her production of the film Orgasm Inc: The Story of OneTaste. Hundreds of people claim that Dunham's production company used their images without their consent, suing Netflix to disallow the film, signing petitions, and creating viral videos protesting the violation. The film reportedly relies on "personal journals" attorneys have said were fabricated despite the film presenting itself as a documentary.

== Personal life ==
Dunham was diagnosed with obsessive–compulsive disorder (OCD) as a child, and continued to take a low dose of an anxiolytic (Klonopin) to relieve her anxiety until 2018. In April 2018 Dunham entered rehab for an addiction to benzodiazepines and later said she loved her experience there. In April 2020, she celebrated two years of sobriety.

In February 2018, Dunham wrote an essay for Vogue about her decision to have a hysterectomy due to endometriosis. In 2019, Dunham revealed that she has Ehlers–Danlos syndrome (EDS).

Dunham has described herself as having a difficult relationship with her body image and her weight and struggles with chronic illness, saying she has often felt she has little control over her body.

In July 2020, Dunham posted on Instagram about her experience having COVID-19, and said she had observed that people were not taking social distancing seriously. She said she was not hospitalized but had "severe symptoms for three weeks".

In her 2026 memoir Famesick, Dunham revealed that she was molested as a child by a babysitter.

=== Relationships ===
From 2012 to December 2017, Dunham was in a relationship with musician Jack Antonoff, lead guitarist of the band fun. and founder of the band Bleachers. Dunham sang on three songs on Antonoff's Gone Now, and directed the video for "Don't Take the Money". After the couple split, they announced that their separation was "amicable". In January 2021, Dunham began dating English-Peruvian musician Luis Felber after a mutual friend set them up. In September 2021, Dunham and Felber married in a Jewish ceremony at the Union Club in Soho, London. Together they have one daughter, born in September 2026, using surrogacy.

== Controversies and criticism ==
=== Not That Kind of Girl and reception ===
In her 2014 memoir Not That Kind of Girl: A Young Woman Tells You What She's "Learned", Dunham wrote she had been sexually assaulted by her former Oberlin College classmate, whom she referred to as "Barry". A former classmate of Dunham hired an attorney, who said the description of "Barry" was detailed enough to identify him. Dunham apologized, and Random House reprinted the book with a disclaimer and statement reading, "Random House, on our own behalf and on behalf of our author, regrets the confusion."

Dunham also wrote that at age seven she had examined the vagina of her one-year-old sibling Cyrus and found pebbles inside that Cyrus had inserted. She claimed to have used candy to bribe Cyrus to play with and kiss Dunham, writing, "Basically, anything a sexual predator might do to woo a small suburban girl I was trying". These descriptions prompted allegations of child sexual abuse by right-wing journalists including Ben Shapiro of TruthRevolt and Kevin D. Williamson of National Review. Media figures including Emily Gould and Roxane Gay defended Dunham, with Gay calling the actions "weird" but not abusive. Cyrus defended Dunham, calling the media backlash part of a campaign to control the "sexualities of young women, queer, and trans people". Dunham apologized for her "comic use of the term 'sexual predator'".

=== Allegations of insensitivity ===
On several occasions, Dunham has been accused of making insensitive remarks and observations.

==== Casting of Girls ====
Upon release, the first season of Girls was critiqued for using an all-white main cast despite being set in the racially diverse city of New York. Season two featured Donald Glover guest starring as Sandy, a Black Republican and Hannah's love interest. The storyline was criticized as tokenism. In an interview with IndieWire, Dunham said:

I am a half-Jew, half-WASP, and I wrote two Jews and two WASPs. Something I wanted to avoid was tokenism in casting. If I had one of the four girls, if, for example, she was African-American, I feel like... there has to be specificity to that experience [that] I wasn't able to speak to... each character was a piece of me or based on someone close to me... I always want to avoid rendering an experience I can't speak to accurately.

==== Defense of Murray Miller ====
In November 2017, Dunham and her creative partner Jenni Konner defended Girls writer Murray Miller, whom actress Aurora Perrineau had accused of sexually assaulting her in 2012, posting a statement that said, "While our first instinct is to listen to every woman's story, our insider knowledge of Murray's situation makes us confident that sadly this accusation is one of the 3% of assault cases that are misreported every year."

Dunham was described by some as a "hipster racist" for her defense of Miller, as Perrineau is mixed-race. In December 2018, Dunham wrote a letter of apology to Perrineau and said that, contrary to her statement, she had no "insider information" that exonerated Murray. In her 2026 memoir Famesick, Dunham wrote that she issued the statement shortly after her hysterectomy while high on pain medication, and said it was the one thing in her life about which she feels "genuine shame".

==== Other remarks ====
In December 2016, Dunham said on her podcast "Women of the Hour" that she never had an abortion but wished she had, so as to better understand women who have experienced it. The comment was widely condemned as insensitive and distasteful. Dunham later posted an apology on her Instagram.

== Political activities ==
Dunham supports gun control, immigrant rights, and LGBT rights. She has supported Democratic Party candidates.

In 2012, Dunham appeared in a video advertisement promoting President Barack Obama's reelection, delivering a monologue, which, according to a blog quoted in The Atlantic, tried to "get the youth vote by comparing voting for the first time to having sex for the first time". Some conservative commentators called likening voting for Obama to losing one's virginity tasteless and inappropriate, Fox News reported. Dunham defended the ad, tweeting, "The video may be light but the message is serious: vote for women's rights." In The Nation, Ari Melber wrote, "the ad's style is vintage Lena: edgy and informed, controversial but achingly self-aware, sexually proud and affirmatively feminist."

In 2014, Dunham was named the Recipient of Horizon Award 2014 by Point Foundation for her support of the gay community.

In April 2016, Dunham published an essay in support of Hillary Clinton and pledged to move to Vancouver, British Columbia, Canada, if Donald Trump won the election. Dunham further criticized Trump after the release of the Access Hollywood tape. After Trump won the 2016 presidential election, Dunham wrote on Instagram that she would not move to Canada, saying, "I can survive staying in this country, MY country, to fight and love and use my embarrassment of blessings to do what's right."

In June 2017, Dunham endorsed Jim Johnson, a Democratic New Jersey gubernatorial candidate, as well as the British Labour Party leader Jeremy Corbyn in the United Kingdom general election.

== Views on Israeli-Palestinian conflict ==
Dunham, who has Jewish ancestry on her mother's side, has expressed mixed feelings about Israel and its military conflicts. She first travelled to Israel in 2010 to screen her film Tiny Furniture at the Jerusalem Film Festival and in 2012 toured Israel and Palestinian territories, visiting East Jerusalem, the Mount of Olives, and the Dead Sea. After the October 7 attacks, Dunham condemned antisemitism (as well as islamophobia, racism, and transphobia) as a worldwide conservative movement to dehumanize minorities. In December 2025, she hosted a screening of the film The Voice of Hind Rajab about the Israel Defense Forces' 2024 killing of Hind Rajab, a six-year-old Palestinian child, in the Gaza Strip.

== Filmography ==
=== Short film ===
Year	Title	Role	Notes
2006	Dealing	Georgia	Also writer and director
2009	The Viewer	Voice	
2009	Family Tree	Lena	

=== Feature film ===
Year	Title	Director	Writer	Producer	Editor
2009	Creative Nonfiction	Yes	Yes	No	Yes
2010	Tiny Furniture	Yes	Yes	No	No
2012	Nobody Walks	No	Yes	No	No
2022	Sharp Stick	Yes	Yes	Yes	No
2022	Catherine Called Birdy	Yes	Yes	Yes	No
2024	Treasure	No	No	Yes	No
2026	Good Sex	Yes	Yes	Yes	No

Acting roles

Year	Title	Role	Notes
2007	Una & Jacques		Video short
2009	The House of the Devil	911 Operator	Voice
2009	Creative Nonfiction	Ella	
2010	Gabi on the Roof in July	Colby	
2010	Tiny Furniture	Aura	
2011	The Innkeepers	Barista	
2012	Supporting Characters	Alexa	
2012	This Is 40	Cat	
2014	Happy Christmas	Carson	
2015	Sky	Billie	
2016	Neighbors 2: Sorority Rising	Joan of Arc	Scenes cut
2016	My Art	Meryl	
2016	My Entire High School Sinking into the Sea	Mary	Voice
2019	Once Upon a Time in Hollywood	"Gypsy"	
2020	The Stand In	Lisa	
2020	Honeydew	Delilah	Cameo
2021	Music	Administrator on Phone with Zu	
2022	Sharp Stick	Heather	
2023	Judy Blume Forever	Herself	Documentary
2024	Treasure	Ruth	
2024	I Wish You All the Best	Ms. Lyons	

=== Television ===
Year	Title	Director	Writer	Producer	Creator	Notes
2007	Tight Shots	Yes	Yes	No	No	Also editor
2009	Delusional Downtown Divas	Yes	Yes	Yes	No	
2012–2017	Girls	Yes	Yes	Executive	Yes	
2018	Camping	No	Yes	Executive	Yes	
2020	Industry	Yes	No	No	No	Episode "Induction"
2021	Generation	No	Yes	Executive	No	Episode "Gays and Confused"
2025	Too Much	Yes	Yes	Executive	Yes	

Acting roles

Year	Title	Role	Notes
2007	Tight Shots		Main role
2009	Delusional Downtown Divas	Oona	Main role
2011	Mildred Pierce	Nurse	2 episodes
2012–2017	Girls	Hannah Horvath	Main role
2014–2016	Adventure Time	Betty Grof	Voice, 3 episodes
2014	Saturday Night Live	Host	Episode: "Lena Dunham/The National"
2015	Scandal	Susanne Thomas	Episode: "It's Good to Be Kink"
2015	7 Days in Hell	Lanny Denver	Television film
2015	The Simpsons	Candace / Hannah Horvath	Voice, episode: "Every Man's Dream"
2017	Travel Man	Herself	Episode: "48 Hours in Tenerife"
2017	American Horror Story: Cult	Valerie Solanas	Episode: "Valerie Solanas Died for Your Sins: Scumbag"
2025	Too Much	Nora South	5 episodes
TBA	It Gets Worse		Upcoming series

=== Music videos ===
Year	Title	Artist	Role	Notes
2014	I Wanna Get Better	Bleachers		Director
2015	Bad Blood (Remix)	Taylor Swift	Lucky Fiori	
2017	Don't Take The Money	Bleachers		Director
2025	TOO MUCH x London Bridge	Fergie		Special thanks

== Awards and nominations ==
Year	Association	Category	Nominated work	Result	Ref.
2012	Primetime Emmy Award	Outstanding Comedy Series	Girls	Nominated	
2012	Primetime Emmy Award	Outstanding Lead Actress in a Comedy Series (Episode: "She Did")	Girls	Nominated	
2012	Primetime Emmy Award	Outstanding Writing for a Comedy Series (Episode: "Pilot")	Girls	Nominated	
2012	Primetime Emmy Award	Outstanding Directing for a Comedy Series (Episode: "She Did")	Girls	Nominated	
2013	Primetime Emmy Award	Outstanding Comedy Series	Girls	Nominated	
2013	Primetime Emmy Award	Outstanding Lead Actress in a Comedy Series (Episode: "Bad Friend")	Girls	Nominated	
2013	Primetime Emmy Award	Outstanding Directing for a Comedy Series (Episode: "On All Fours")	Girls	Nominated	
2014	Primetime Emmy Award	Outstanding Lead Actress in a Comedy Series (Episode: "Beach House")	Girls	Nominated	
2013	BAFTA Awards	Best International Programme	Girls	Won	
2012	Directors Guild of America Awards	Outstanding Directorial – Comedy Series	Girls	Won	
2012	Golden Globe Awards	Best Actress in a Television Series – Musical or Comedy	Girls	Won	
2013	Golden Globe Awards	Best Actress in a Television Series – Musical or Comedy	Girls	Nominated	
2014	Golden Globe Awards	Best Actress in a Television Series – Musical or Comedy	Girls	Nominated	
2010	Independent Spirit Award	Best First Feature	Tiny Furniture	Nominated	
2010	Independent Spirit Award	Best First Screenplay	Tiny Furniture	Won	
2022	Independent Spirit Award	Best Screenplay	Catherine Called Birdy	Nominated	

== Bibliography ==
Books

- Not That Kind of Girl: A Young Woman Tells You What She's "Learned". New York, NY: Random House. 2014. ISBN 978-0-812-99499-5.
- Is it Evil Not to be Sure?. New York, NY: Random House. 2017. ISBN 978-1-524-77668-8.
- Best And Always. New York, NY: Harper Collins. 2019. ISBN 978-1-460-75682-9.
- Famesick. New York, NY: Harper Collins. 2026. ISBN 978-0-008-38422-7.

Essays and reporting

- "Funny Girl: Sarah Silverman". Paper. April 28, 2010.
- "Seeing Nora Everywhere". The New Yorker. June 28, 2012.
- "First Love". The New Yorker. August 13, 2012.
- "A Box of Puppies". The New Yorker. March 25, 2013.
- "Deliverance". Take Out. The New Yorker. 89 (35): 78. November 4, 2013.
- "Difficult girl : growing up with help". Personal History. The New Yorker. 90 (25): 24–28. September 1, 2014.
- "Dog or Jewish Boyfriend? A Quiz". The New Yorker. March 30, 2015.
- "The Bride in Her Head". The New Yorker. July 10, 2015.
- "The Enduring Spell of 'The Outsiders'". The New York Times Style Magazine. September 5, 2018.

== See also ==
- List of Oberlin College and Conservatory people
