= Index Magazine =

index Magazine
- Categories: Culture magazine
- Frequency: 5 per year
- Founder: Peter Halley and Bob Nickas
- First issue: February 1996
- Final issue: November 2005
- Country: United States
- Based in: New York City
- Language: English
- Website: www.indexmagazine.com

index Magazine was a New York City-based publication with interviews with art and culture figures. It was created by Peter Halley and Bob Nickas in 1996, running until late 2005.

Covering the burgeoning indie culture of the 1990s, Index regularly employed photographers Juergen Teller, Terry Richardson, Wolfgang Tillmans, and Ryan McGinley, and had interviews with Björk, Brian Eno, Marc Jacobs, and Scarlett Johansson, mixing new talents and established names in music, film, architecture, fashion, art, and politics. The publication also had interviews with local New York City personalities such as Queen Itchie and Ducky Doolittle.

In 2014, it launched Index A to Z: Art, Design, Fashion, Film, and Music in the Indie Era. The book about indie culture was published by Rizzoli.

The magazine also produced the online series Delusional Downtown Divas, starring Isabel Halley and Lena Dunham.
