= Too Much (TV series) =

2025 romantic comedy TV series

- Promotional poster
- Genre: Romantic comedy
- Created by: Lena Dunham; Luis Felber
- Starring: Megan Stalter; Will Sharpe
- Composers: Luis Felber; Matt Allchin
- Countries of origin: United States; United Kingdom
- Original language: English
- No. of episodes: 10

Production
- Executive producers: Tim Bevan; Eric Fellner; Lena Dunham; Michael P. Cohen; Surian Fletcher-Jones; Bruce Eric Kaplan
- Producer: Camilla Bray
- Camera setup: Single-camera
- Running time: 31–56 minutes
- Production companies: Good Thing Going; Working Title Television; Universal International Studios

Original release
- Network: Netflix
- Release: July 10, 2025

Too Much is a romantic comedy limited series created by Lena Dunham and Luis Felber, starring Megan Stalter and Will Sharpe. It was released on Netflix on July 10, 2025. In November 2025, Netflix announced that the show would not be renewed for a second season.

== Premise ==
After a traumatic break-up, thirty-something New York City commercial producer Jessica accepts a work transfer to London.

Jessica, a fan of British period films and romances, is taken aback by her council flat accommodation and loneliness. After forcing herself to visit a pub alone, Jessica witnesses musician Felix performing. Felix and she eventually connect and he returns home with her; A romance slowly blooms between the two. Felix and Jessica must bridge cultural relationship divides, their respective relationship histories, and own family dynamics in order to hopefully sustain a healthy relationship.

== Cast and characters ==
=== Main ===
- Megan Stalter as Jessica Salmon, a New York City commercial producer who moves to London
- Will Sharpe as Felix Remen, a London indie musician

=== Recurring ===
- Dean-Charles Chapman as Gaz, Jessica's London neighbor
- Lena Dunham as Nora South, Jessica's older sister
- Oliver Nirenberg as Dash South, Nora and Jameson's 13-year-old son
- Rhea Perlman as Dottie, Jessica's maternal grandmother
- Andrew Rannells as Jameson South, Jessica's New York City boss and Nora's ex-husband
- Emily Ratajkowski as Wendy Jones, an influencer and Zev's new girlfriend
- Rita Wilson as Lois Salmon, Jessica's mother
- Michael Zegen as Zev, Jessica's ex-boyfriend
- Daisy Bevan as Josie, Jonno's assistant
- Janicza Bravo as Kim Keith Independiente, one of Jessica's London co-workers
- Richard E. Grant as Jonno Ratigan, Jessica's London boss
- Prasanna Puwanarajah as Auggie, Felix's roommate and close friend
- Leo Reich as Boss Gibbons, one of Jessica's London co-workers
- Carlos O'Connell as Eoin, the bass player in Felix's band
- Naomi Watts as Ann Ratigan, Jonno's wife
- Adèle Exarchopoulos as Polly, Felix's French ex-girlfriend

=== Guest ===
- Jessica Alba as herself
- Adwoa Aboah as Linnea, a dominatrix and Felix's ex-girlfriend
- Kit Harington as Jessica's father
- Andrew Scott as Jim Wenlich Rice, a pretentious film director
- Stephen Fry as Simon Remen, Felix's father
- Kaori Momoi as Aiko Remen, Felix's mother
- Joséphine de La Baume as Wheezy, another French ex-girlfriend of Felix's and Polly's former friend
- Sophia Di Martino as Silvia Violet, Georgia-Peach's sister
- David Jonsson as Oriel Terrabianco, Felix's old schoolmate
- Sonoya Mizuno as Peregrine, Felix's ex-girlfriend
- Clara Paget as Georgia-Peach, Oriel's newlywed wife
- Rita Ora as herself
- Jennifer Saunders as Fiona, an old friend of Felix's
- Alix Earle as herself
- Jake Shane as himself
- Owen Thiele as himself

== Episodes ==
No.	Title	Directed by	Written by	Original release date
1	"Nonsense & Sensibility"	Lena Dunham	Teleplay by : Lena Dunham; Story by : Lena Dunham & Luis Felber	July 10, 2025
Jessica is a struggling producer in New York City, burned out by years in the industry. After seeing her ex-boyfriend Zev has proposed to his influencer girlfriend Wendy, the woman he left her for, Jessica drunkenly breaks into their apartment and confronts them. At work, she fumbles a day on set with Jessica Alba. Jessica's boss and former brother-in-law Jameson offers her a job at an advertising agency in London, which she accepts in a bid to start over. Once there, Jessica and her dog Astrid move into a council estate in Hackney. At a local pub, she befriends Felix, an indie musician. He walks her home, but he rebuffs her attempt to kiss him, explaining that he has a girlfriend. After he leaves, Jessica accidentally sets her nightgown on fire while recording an angry video about Wendy. Her neighbor Gaz calls the paramedics, who spray her with water in the bathtub. Charmed by Jessica, Felix decides to return to the flat.
2	"Pity Woman"	Lena Dunham	Lena Dunham	July 10, 2025
Felix and Astrid break Jessica out of the hospital following her burn. Back at Jessica's flat, the two sleep together. The next day, Felix confides in his roommate Auggie that Jessica is someone special and has a complicated breakup with his girlfriend Linnea. Jessica settles into her new role at work, where her co-workers worry she is moving too fast with Felix. When they go out as a group to meet a footballer, his crass behaviour drives Jessica back to Felix; she asks him if he is love-bombing her, but he is not sure. Felix gives Jessica a mixtape he made for her and they listen to it together.
3	"Ignore Sunrise"	Lena Dunham	Lena Dunham	July 10, 2025
Jessica is reprimanded by Jonno for underperforming at work, where she has not made strong impressions on any of the staff. Meanwhile, Felix searches for work beyond his band. Jessica and Felix spend more and more evenings together, growing closer, though Jessica struggles to move on from thoughts of Zev and Wendy.
4	"Notting Kill"	Lena Dunham	Lena Dunham	July 10, 2025
Jonno and his wife Ann invite the team at work to their home for dinner, and Jessica brings Felix as her date. Jessica quickly bonds with Ann, and the two do cocaine in the bathroom together. Jessica lies to Felix about the drugs and alcohol she has been consuming, as he is sober and she believes he is sensitive to substance use. Soon afterwards, the whole party apart from Felix partake in cocaine, champagne, and dancing. Felix sees an old photo on the wall that he is in, and a drunk Jonno eventually recognizes him as his daughter Viola's boarding school beau. Jonno accuses Felix of abandoning Viola at the end of their relationship and the two get into a physical altercation, where Felix reveals Viola cheated on him with another boy at school. After leaving the party, Jessica unloads her anxieties and concerns about Felix's "red flags", and he reciprocates, but the two ultimately find themselves more endeared to each other.
5	"Pink Valentine"	Lena Dunham	Lena Dunham	July 10, 2025
Felix invites Jessica to watch his band play at a local pig farm, where she meets his friends, including Polly, the woman he once dated for 10 years. Feeling jealous and anxious, especially with Felix distracted, Jessica agrees to snort ketamine, but she becomes so disoriented that Polly sends her home. That evening, Jessica reminisces on her relationship with Zev: he gradually began to confront her with accusations she had an anxious attachment style, self-sabotaged due to low self-esteem, was unmotivated, and more; as his frustration with her worsened, the two grew apart; and, after Jessica became pregnant as a result of a one-night stand with another man, the two ended their relationship and she had an abortion. Felix meets Jessica at her flat and confesses he felt embarrassed about his modest gig. She tells him she loves him, and though he has strong feelings for her, Felix is not able to say the same back.
6	"To Doubt a Boy"	Lena Dunham	Lena Dunham & Collier Meyerson	July 10, 2025
Felix comes closer to hitting a breaking point with his bandmates, who are mediocre and miss Felix's wilder days before he became sober. He asks Jessica if he can move in with her temporarily, but Jessica feels they might be moving too fast, and he ends up staying with Polly. Jessica goes on a work trip to the countryside with Jonno and the team, as they meet with difficult director Jim Wenlich Rice to film a Christmas commercial. Back on Long Island, Jessica's mother Lois confronts her depressed daughter Nora, who is struggling to care for herself and her teenage son Dash. Polly attempts to hook up with Felix, but he rebuffs her due to his feelings for Jessica. After a long day, Jessica and Jim bond at a local pub, culminating in a failed hookup after Jim cannot stop thinking about his ex-wife. Jessica immediately returns to London and asks Felix to move in with her.
7	"Terms of Resentment"	Lena Dunham	Lena Dunham & Luis Felber	July 10, 2025
Felix sells his car for £1,000 and goes to visit his parents without sharing the details of his family life with Jessica. On the drive home from the train station, Felix's mother Aiko stops by the family's old home, a lavish estate that reminds Felix of his difficult childhood, including his parents' neglect. Felix gives his father Simon the cash, as Simon is financially destitute and hoping to make moves to buy back the estate, but secretly takes it back before leaving, frustrated by Simon's flippant attitude. At Jessica's flat, Felix breaks down over his resentments towards his family, revealing the nanny who raised him in his parents' absence sexually abused him. Jessica lovingly tucks him into bed.
8	"One Wedding and a Sex Pest"	Janicza Bravo	Lena Dunham & Monica Heisey	July 10, 2025
Zev spends a majority of his therapy sessions dissecting his toxic relationship with Jessica. Meanwhile, Jessica and Felix attend the wedding of one of his schoolmates. There, they meet Felix's friends, including Auggie, Polly, Linnea, and another old flame, Wheezy. Jessica struggles with jealousy, Felix's awkward behavior, and the lack of grace offered by his friends, going so far as to fantasize about cheating with Zev. Felix has a couple of glasses of champagne, breaking his three-year sobriety, and lies to Jessica when she questions him about drinking. At the end of the night, Felix confesses he does not much like his old friends or the person he is around them, but he has maintained these relationships to avoid loneliness. Fed up with Felix's cop-outs, and his refusal to stand up for the both of them in the face of his friends' toxicity, Jessica leaves the wedding early.
9	"Enough, Actually"	Alicia MacDonald	Lena Dunham	July 10, 2025
Jessica and Felix remain emotionally distanced following the wedding. In the midst of a hectic shoot for Jim's commercial starring Rita Ora, the ranting videos Jessica had been posting to her secret social media account, primarily about Wendy, are exposed. Meanwhile, Ann tells Jonno she is leaving him over his neglect. At home, Jessica tries to share her excitement over winning over a difficult day, but Felix is too dejected to care. He leaves to go partying, meeting an old friend, Fiona, to whom he confides his lack of self-worth before the two have inebriated sex. Felix returns to Jessica's flat, confessing everything, and she breaks up with him.
10	"The Idea of Glue"	Lena Dunham	Lena Dunham	July 10, 2025
While preparing to move out of Jessica's flat, Felix realizes Astrid is having a medical emergency and rushes her to a veterinary hospital, where she dies. Devastated, Jessica angrily confronts Felix about their breakup, which devolves into Felix slapping himself and calling her a bitch. Jessica calls Jameson, who offers to help her re-establish her career in the United States. Jameson and Nora rekindle their marriage. Wendy arranges to meet with Jessica, where she reveals her relationship with Zev has deteriorated due to his toxic behaviors, and the two bond. Inspired, Jessica asks Gaz to drive her to see Felix, and the two confess to each other that they share the toxic habit of sabotaging emotionally intense relationships. Finally accepting even the broken parts of each other, Jessica and Felix get married.

== Production ==
=== Development ===
Wife and husband team Lena Dunham and Luis Felber executive produced the ten-episodes series with Dunham directing and Felber providing original music. The executive producers also include Tim Bevan, Eric Fellner, Michael P. Cohen, Surian Fletcher-Jones and Bruce Eric Kaplan, with Camilla Bray as producer. The series is produced by Working Title Television as well as Dunham's Good Thing Going banner.

=== Casting ===
Megan Stalter and Will Sharpe were confirmed in the lead roles in December 2023. In February 2024, Emily Ratajkowski was reportedly in talks for a role. A more complete cast list was announced the following month.

=== Filming ===
Filming took place in Beaconsfield, Buckinghamshire, in February 2024. Filming took place in Brooklyn, New York City, in June 2024. Filming also took place in London in 2024.

== Release and reception ==
All episodes of Too Much premiered on Netflix on July 10, 2025.

=== Critical response ===
The review aggregator website Rotten Tomatoes reported a 79% approval rating based on 82 critic reviews. The website's critics consensus reads, "A winning showcase for Megan Stalter, Too Much's approach to modern love is coolly detached but creator Lena Dunham's sharp sense of humor remains just right." Metacritic, which uses a weighted average, assigned a score of 68 out of 100 based on 33 critics, indicating "generally favorable".

Reviewing the series for USA Today, Kelly Lawler gave a rating of 3/4 and described it as "very funny and sweet, but also at times distinctly melancholy, and it navigates its different moods gracefully." Ben Travers of IndieWire gave a B and said, "Dunham's latest pulls off a tricky balancing act: giving audiences what we expect from a TV rom-com, as well as what we don't always get. Inkoo Kang of The New Yorker commented, "With its quicksilver shifts and sneaking sweetness, the experience of watching feels a lot like falling in love." Robert Lloyd of Los Angeles Times wrote, "The endgame, when we get to it, could not be any more conventional—which, I imagine, is the idea."

In the United Kingdom, Lucy Mangan of The Guardian was more critical, writing that the show "abandons any thoughts of innovation and hits cliche after cliche... the irreducible fact remains that Too Much would not be enough from anyone. From Dunham, it is way, way too little."
