= Luis Felber =

British musician (born 1986)

- Born: Luis Delfin Attawalpa Saul Felber; 9 June 1986 (age 40); England
- Occupation: Musician
- Spouse: Lena Dunham (m. 2021)
- Children: 1 (surrogacy)
- Mother: Alma Laura de Felber

Luis Delfin Attawalpa Saul Felber (born 9 June 1986) is a British musician.

Born in England, to a Peruvian mother and a British father, Felber spent his earliest years in Peru and Chile before moving back to Britain at the age of seven. Felber attended Bedales School in Petersfield before leaving to attend music college in Guildford aged 17. Felber's father is Jewish. Felber began pursuing a career in music, playing guitar with several different bands at age 17.

== Career ==
He is one of the founders of the label and club night Young Turks. Felber signed with Luv Luv Luv and performed in a duo called Shuga and was also a member of party band Turbogeist.

Felber used to play with Jamie T and Ben Bones. Felber wrote a song with Mick Jagger that was later featured on Vinyl, the 2016 series created by Jagger himself, along with Martin Scorsese and Terence Winter.

In 2020, Felber began recording and performing solo under the name Attawalpa—which is his middle name, after the last Incan monarch Atahualpa (died 1533). He released the debut EP Spells.

In 2021, the album Patterns was released and features five songs released throughout the pandemic. Each comes with its own video. Lena Dunham directed the video for song "Tucked in Tight" and it was filmed on an iPhone in London and the English countryside.

Dunham and Felber worked on the soundtrack for the film Catherine Called Birdy, and also co-created Too Much, a romantic comedy loosely based on their relationship.

== Personal life ==
After a mutual friend set them up on a blind date, Felber began dating director, writer and actress Lena Dunham in January 2021. In September 2021, Felber married Dunham in a Jewish ceremony in England, wearing a custom blue suede suit designed by Emily Bode. Together they have one child, born with the use of surrogacy.

Felber resides in London, England.
