= Delusional Downtown Divas =

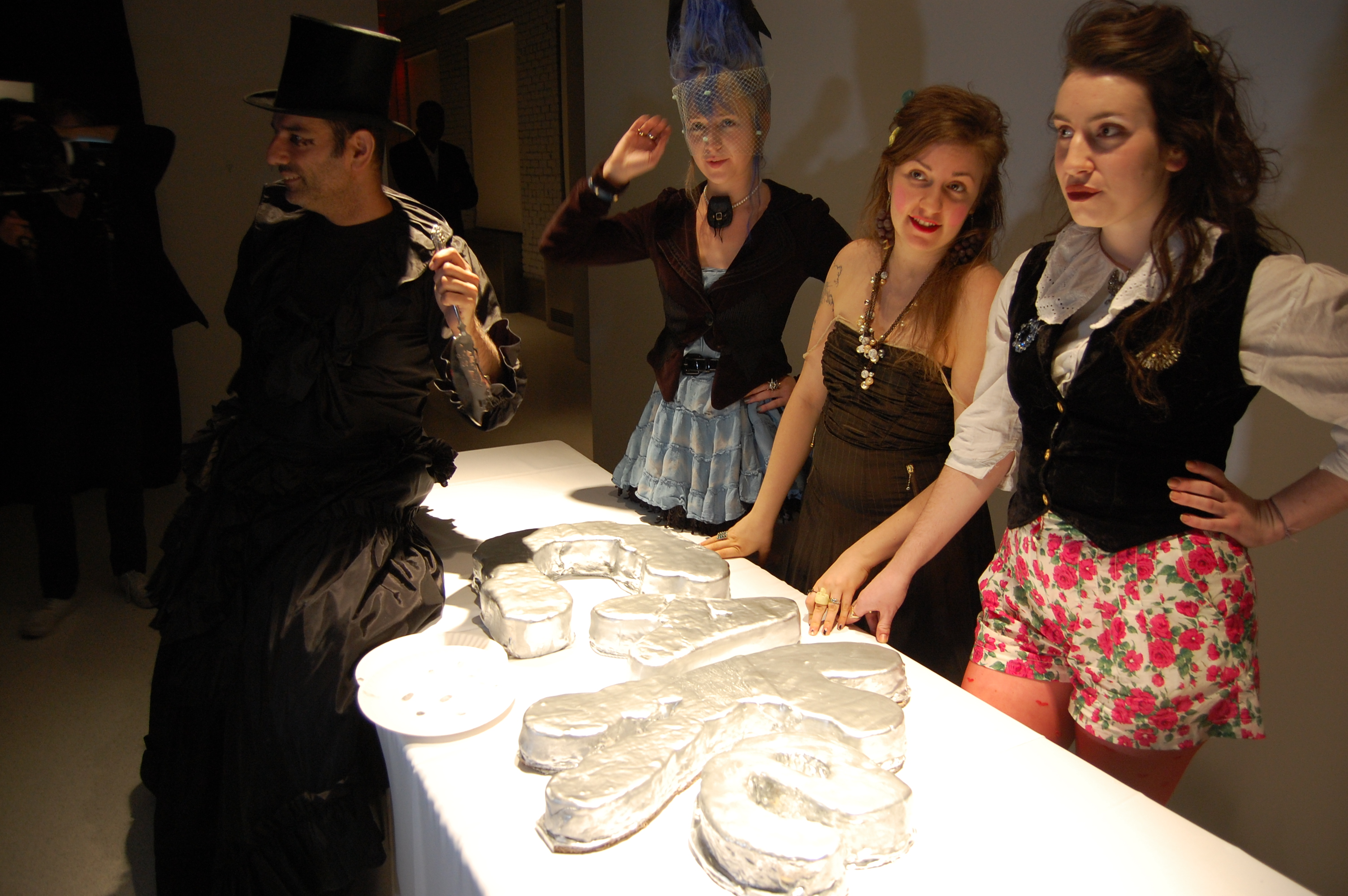
- Joana D'Avillez, Lena Dunham, Isabel Halley on set, 2009
- Created by: Lena Dunham
- Directed by: Lena Dunham
- Starring: Lena Dunham; Isabel Halley; Joana D'avillez
- Country of origin: United States
- No. of seasons: 2
- No. of episodes: 20

Production
- Production location: New York City
- Editor: Sara Rossein
- Running time: 6–7 minutes

Delusional Downtown Divas is a scripted comedy webseries by Lena Dunham. The show was originally commissioned by Index Magazine (founded by Isabel Halley's father, the artist Peter Halley) and was first shown at the Art Production Fund lab in January 2009.

The show revolves around three young women who were raised amidst the New York City art world, and try to establish themselves in the art community with mixed success. The series heavily parodies the New York art world. Art industry insiders such as Yvonne Force Villareal, Nate Lowman, Rob Pruitt, and others have cameos.

The show brought much attention to creator Lena Dunham. In 2010, it was announced that Dunham was creating a television show for HBO. The show, Girls, draws from Dunham's first show, Delusional Downtown Divas.

Ten full episodes and a short title video are available on Vimeo, and an additional nine on YouTube.

== Cast and characters ==
- Swann (Joana D'Avillez), is a private performance artist. Her performances pieces are generally so private that no one sees them.
- AgNess (Isabel Halley), is the self described "business woman" of the Divas. All of the characters live at AgNess' parents house.
- Oona (Lena Dunham), considers herself to be a novelist, but it's unclear if she's ever written anything more than the first third of her novel.
