= Doaa Al Zamel =

Syrian refugee and shipwreck survivor

- Born: 9 July 1995 (age 31); Daraa, Syria
- Known for: Surviving the 2014 Malta migrant shipwreck

Doaa Al Zamel (born 9 July 1995 in Daraa, Syria) is a Syrian refugee and one of 11 survivors of the 2014 Malta migrant shipwreck that killed approximately 500 people.

In 2012, fleeing the Syria civil war, Al Zamel's family moved to Egypt, where she got engaged. After Abdel Fattah el-Sisi took over Egypt, her fiancé Bassem and Al Zamel paid people smugglers to flee to Europe in 2014. They boarded a crowded boat with 500 other migrants and refugees. The boat capsized after being rammed by the smugglers. All but eleven of the 500 people drowned, including Bassem. Al Zamel survived four days at sea, holding two infants and was rescued, taken to Greece and then resettled in Sweden.

== Early life ==
Al Zamel was born in Daraa, Syria, two hours away from Damascus and grew up with her five sisters and one brother. Her father was a barber. She was six years old, when demonstrations against president Bashar al-Assad started, and 16 when the Syrian civil war broke out in 2011. After her father's shop was destroyed, the family fled to Egypt, in November 2012.

== Egypt ==
In Egypt, Al Zamel got engaged to a man called Bassem. After the change of Egyptian leadership from Mohamed Morsi to Abdel Fattah el-Sisi, circumstances deteriorated for refugees like Bassem and Al Zamel and they decided to flee to Sweden for a better quality of life. To start that journey, Bassem paid people smugglers his life savings of US$2,500 to take them both by boat via the Mediterranean Sea to Italy.

== Journey to Europe ==
On September 6 2014, Al Zamel and Bassem boarded an overcrowded Egyptian fishing trawler with approximately 500 other refugees and migrants. Al Zamel was 19 years old at the time of the journey and could not swim.

During the journey, the people smugglers forced the passengers to change boats several times. As they still were 16 hours away from Italy, the smugglers told the passengers to change boats one final time, but the passengers refused. The smugglers then rammed the passengers' boat, knocking everyone into the sea, and shouting "Let the fish eat your flesh". All but about fifty people drowned in the first few minutes; Al Zamel survived by clinging to a children's lifebuoy that Bassem found. Some fifty initial survivors started to drown over the next two days, and a man from Gaza gave Al Zamel his nine-month old granddaughter, Malak, pleading for Al Zamel to take hold of her. Both the grandfather and Bassem drowned shortly after. Then another family swam to Al Zamel and asked her to hold their 18-month old daughter Masa, which she did.

After four days at sea, a merchant vessel found the survivors and took them on board. Al Zamel, Malak and Masa were three of only eleven people who survived the shipwreck. Malak died five hours after the rescue.

== Arrival in Europe ==
After her rescue, Al Zamel was taken to Greece and later resettled by the United Nations High Commissioner for Refugees in Sweden. Masa was reconnected with an uncle and also lives in Sweden.

== In popular culture ==
Al Zamel's story is featured in the Book A Hope More Powerful than the Sea by Melissa Fleming of the United Nations High Commission for Refugees. Steven Spielberg bought the rights to make a film about the story. In 2018, the producers received criticism for commissioning white American writer Lena Dunham to adapt the novel for the screen, being accused of whitewashing.

Al Zamel was featured in the 2019 documentary Beyond Borders, produced by Craig Templeton Smith, along with fellow Syrian refugees Ayesha, Fewaz, and Hani Al Moulia.

== See also ==
- 2015 European migrant crisis
- Timeline of the 2015 European migrant crisis
