= 2014 Malta migrant shipwreck =

Ship that sank off the coast of Malta, killing around 500

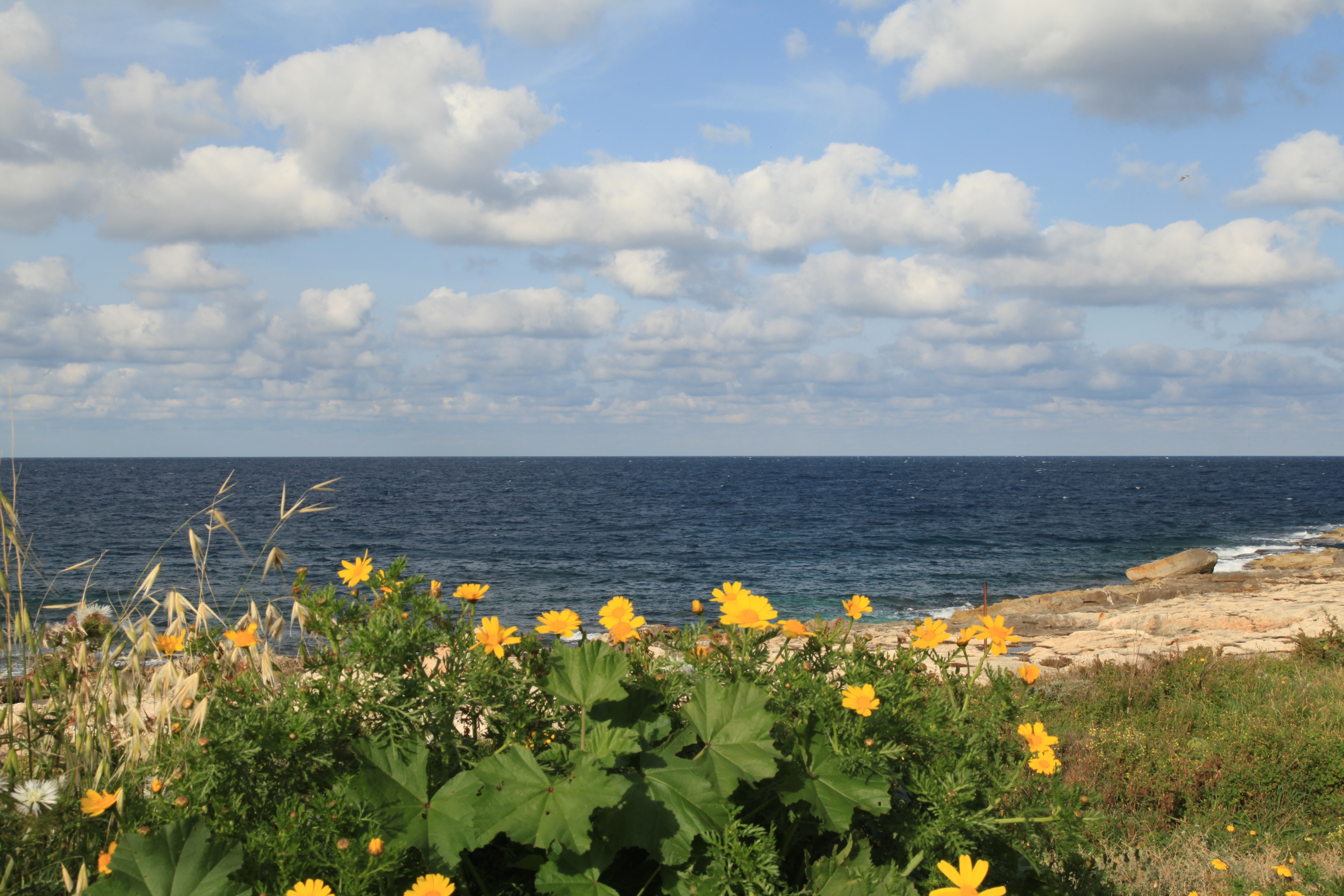
A view towards the Mediterranean from Malta.

In September 2014, it was announced by the International Organization for Migration that a ship sank off the Malta coast on September 11, 2014, killing around 500 migrants. There were eleven survivors. The ship left Damietta, Egypt, on September 6 and sank five days later on September 11, after being struck by the vessel into which the traffickers had planned to transfer the refugees. Two Palestinian survivors of the wreck accuse the traffickers of intentionally sinking the vessel after the refugees would not agree to transfer to a different ship.

The book A Hope More Powerful than the Sea was written by Melissa Fleming about Syrian refugee Doaa Al Zamel's experiences leading up to and during the shipwreck and published by Fleet in 2017.

== Similar tragedy in 2023 ==
A tragedy on a similar scale occurred on 14 June 2023 in the Ionian Sea off the coast of Pylos, Greece, when a dilapidated and overloaded fishing trawler carrying as many as 750 people capsized and sank, resulting in the drowning death of hundreds of men, women, and children who were asylum seekers from Pakistan, Syria, Palestine, and Egypt. Among the 104 people rescued, there were no women and children. The Hellenic Coast Guard search and rescue operation recovered 92 bodies with 500 considered to be missing and presumed dead.

== See also ==
- Timeline of the European migrant crisis
- Doaa Al Zamel (one of the eleven survivors)
