= A Hope More Powerful than the Sea =

2017 non-fiction book by Melissa Fleming

- Author: Melissa Fleming
- Genre: Non-fiction
- Publisher: Fleet
- Publication date: 2017

A Hope More Powerful than the Sea is a book by Melissa Fleming about Syrian refugee Doaa Al Zamel's experiences leading up to and during the 2014 Malta migrant shipwreck.

== Production ==
A Hope More Powerful than the Sea was published by Fleet in 2017. It was written by Melissa Fleming, then chief spokesperson for the United Nations High Commissioner for Refugees, now serving as the United Nations Under-Secretary-General for Global Communications.

== Synopsis ==
Doaa Al Zamel grows up in Daraa, Syria. She has a happy childhood, living in the extended family home, until the Syrian civil war breaks out. Aged 19, her life is turned upside down by the violence and she is forced to flee the country together with her family. They travel first to Egypt where Doaa gets engaged to a fellow refugee, Bassam. When life becomes untenable there too, Bassam and Doaa take the dangerous but understandable decision to risk their lives to reach Europe. They pay people smugglers to carry them across the sea, and board a boat crammed with 500 other refugees. After four days, the boat is attacked and left to capsize in the rough Mediterranean Sea. Hundreds are killed instantly in a horrific shipwreck that remains among the deadliest recorded along the route. Bassam dies after two days in the water, leaving Dooa, who cannot swim, alone, looking after two tiny babies among the dead. When she is finally rescued, she is found with the two young girls clinging to her.

== Critical reception ==
Jenny Sawyer writing in The Christian Science Monitor described the book as "required reading," and credited Fleming's ability to tell the personal story and frame it in the wider refugee crisis, but also notes the lack of Al Zamel's own voice, the story only ever being told by the third party narrator.

Hannah Solel writing in the Financial Times called the book "as gripping as it is moving," while The New Yorker praised the book for bringing "a moral urgency to the narrative." Meanwhile Newsweek said it "deftly illustrates the pain of those who choose to leave Syria" and described the story as ultimately being one of hope.

== Screen adaptation ==
Steven Spielberg bought the adaptation rights to the book. In 2018, Syrian rights activists accused Spielberg and co-producer JJ Abrams of whitewashing for hiring white American screenwriter and actor Lena Dunham to write the screenplay. Author Melissa Fleming defended the project, writing: “The book is a true story entrusted to me by Doaa. If I hadn’t written it, I am afraid it would have not been told, her voice a one-day news story." As of 2025, the film project appears to be on hold, with no further public updates on its status since 2018.
