= Melissa Fleming =

United Nations Under-Secretary-General for Global Communications

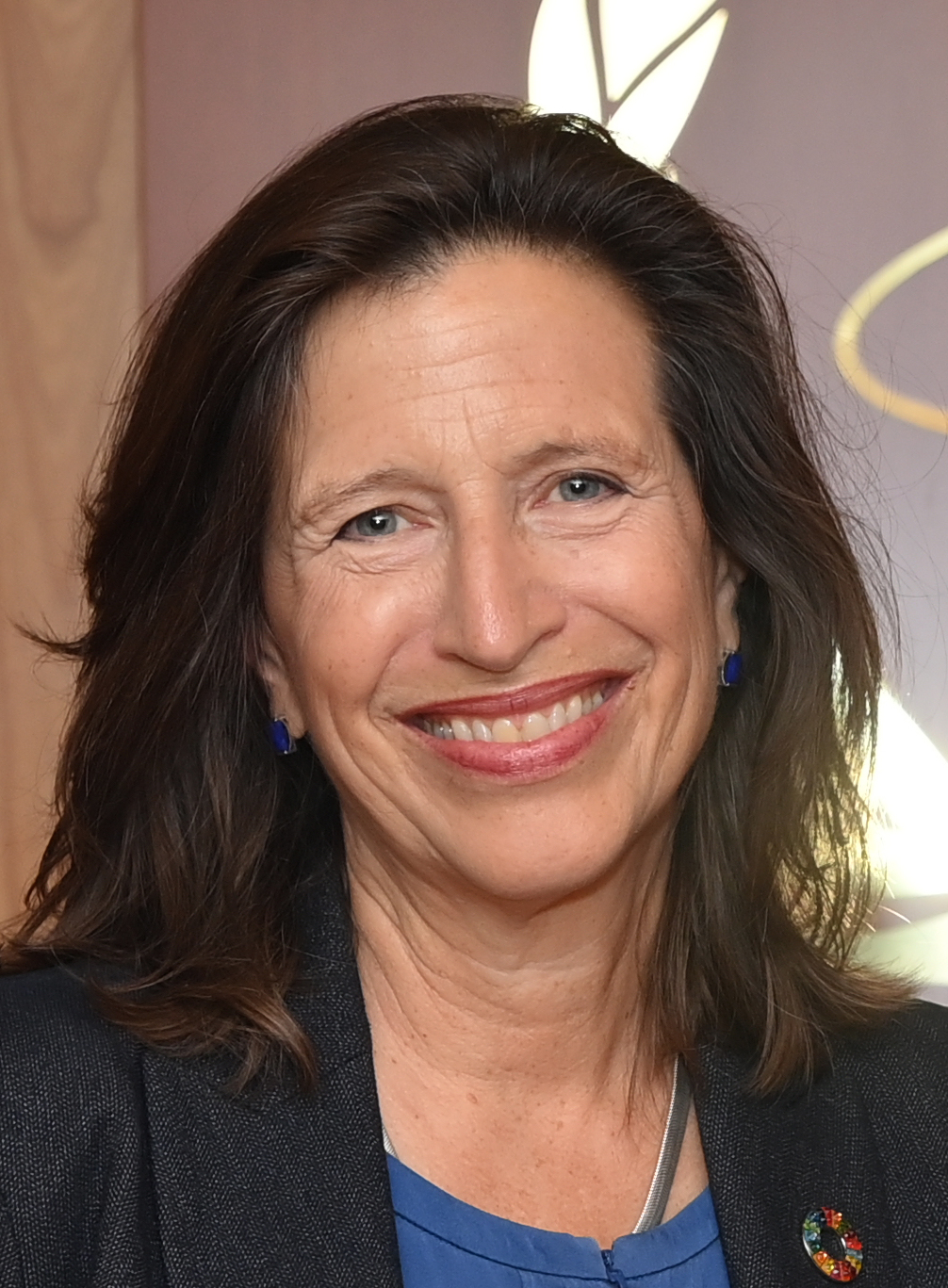
- Education: Oberlin College; Boston University
- Occupations: Journalist, author, communications professional
- Employer: United Nations Department of Global Communications
- Notable work: A Hope More Powerful than the Sea (2017 book)

Melissa Ruth Fleming is an American journalist, author, and United Nations official. She has been head of the United Nations Department of Global Communications since 2019.

She is the author of A Hope More Powerful than the Sea.

== Education ==
Melissa Fleming holds a bachelor's degree in German studies from Oberlin College, Ohio and a masters degree in broadcast journalism from Boston University.

== Career ==
Fleming started her career as a journalist. Between 1989 and 1994, Fleming worked as a Public Affairs Specialist for Radio Free Europe/Radio Liberty in Munich. From September 1994 to January 2001 she was head of the Press and Public Information Team at the Organization for Security and Co-operation in Europe in Vienna. In January 2001 Fleming took over as Spokesperson and Head of the Media and Outreach at the International Atomic Energy Agency in Vienna, a post she held until June 2009.

From July 2009 to 2019, Fleming worked as Head of Global Communications for the United Nations High Commissioner for Refugees (UNHCR) in Geneva and as the Spokesperson for the High Commissioner. Her comments on the 2015 European refugee crisis gained attention across the continent. At UNHCR, she led campaigns, social media engagement and a multimedia news service covering stories designed to generate empathy and stir action for refugees. In 2017 she wrote A Hope More Powerful Than the Sea book about Syrian refugee Doaa Al Zamel's experiences leading up to and during the 2014 Malta migrant shipwreck. She began hosting the UNHCR podcast, Awake at Night, and carried the podcast over to the UN in 2019.

From 2016 to 2017, she served as Senior Advisor and Spokesperson on the incoming United Nations Secretary General's Transition Team. On September 1, 2019, she was appointed an Under Secretary-General of the United Nations, taking over from predecessor Alison Smale as head of the UN Department of Global Communications.
