= Hani Al Moulia =

Blind refugee photographer

Hani Al Moulia is a legally blind photographer and Syrian refugee, based in Regina, Saskatchewan.

== Early life ==
Hani Al Moulia was born in Syria, and his father is Mohammad Al Moulia.

Al Moulia has nystagmus and cannot see many colours, nor see through a camera viewfinder. He can only focus on things that are within 10 centimeters of his face.

In 2012, he fled violence and persecution in Homs, Syria and moved as a refugee to the Bekaa Valley, Lebanon where he taught himself English.

While in the Bekka Valley, Al Moulia was taught photography at a workshop run by the United Nations High Commissioner for Refugees.

== Life in Canada ==
The Al Moulia family arrived in Canada in 2015. The same year, Hani Al Moulia displayed his work at the Canadian Journalists for Free Expression's gala - it is unusual for amateur photographers to be able to display their work, but an exception was made for Al Moulia.

In 2017, his photography was featured in West Vancouver Museum's exhibit Home/Shelter/Belonging and in the Harmony Arts Festival. The Halifax Festival of Photography, also exhibited his It's Not Impossible exhibition.

Al Moulia served on the Canadian Prime Minister's Youth Council and was a speaker at WE Day events.

== Education ==
Al Moulia did not complete high school in order to help his parents with farming sheep.

He is advancing his English at the University of Regina.

Al Moulia received a scholarship from Toronto's Ryerson University where he studies computer engineering.

== Family ==
Hani Al Moulia is the oldest of six siblings.
