= Not That Kind of Girl =

2014 book by Lena Dunham

Not That Kind of Girl: A Young Woman Tells You What She's "Learned"
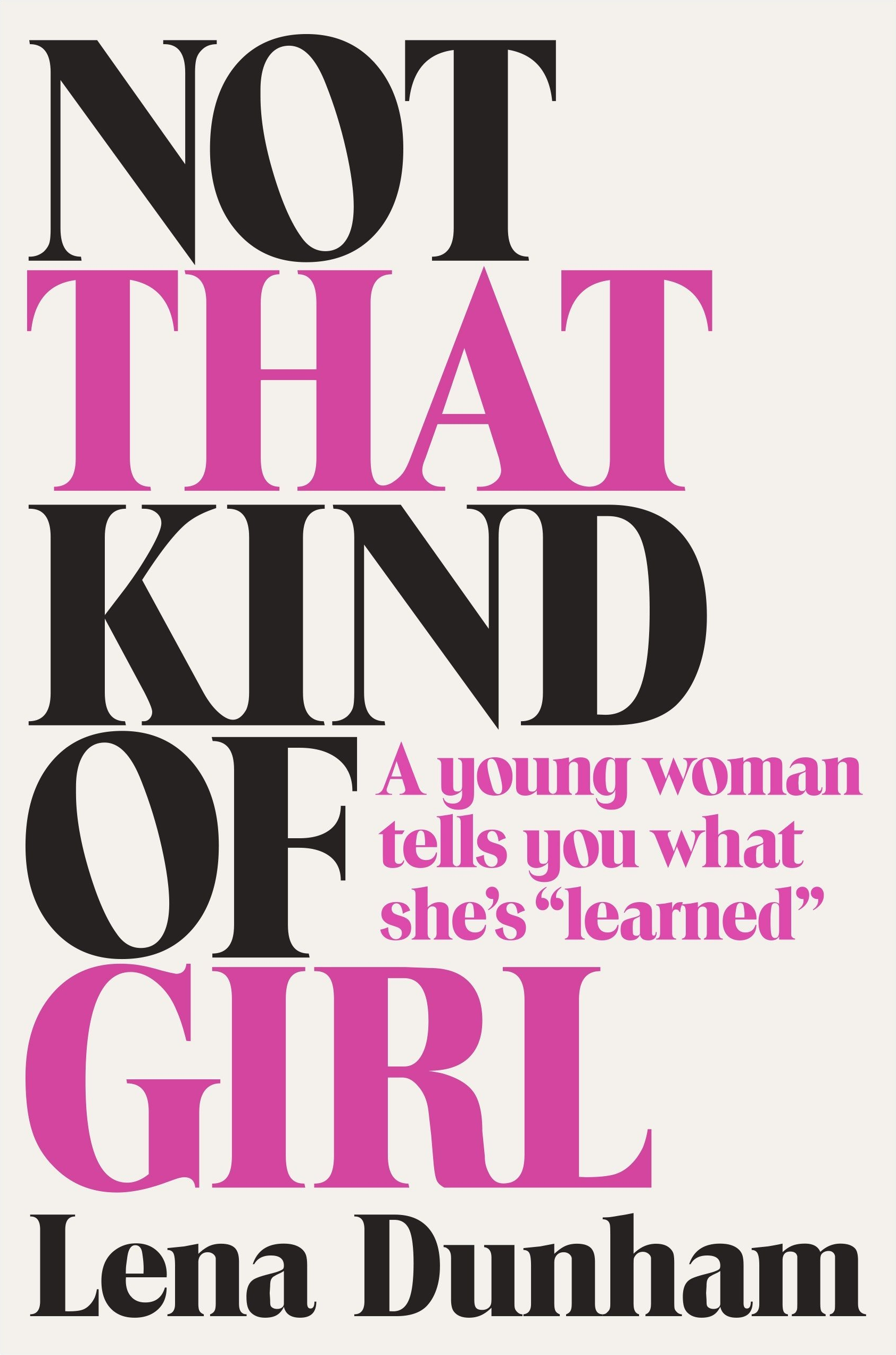
- First edition cover
- Author: Lena Dunham
- Language: English
- Genre: Memoir, autobiography
- Published: September 30, 2014
- Publisher: Random House
- Publication place: United States
- Pages: 265
- ISBN: 978-0-8129-9499-5

Not That Kind of Girl: A Young Woman Tells You What She's "Learned" is a 2014 memoir written by American writer, director, and actress Lena Dunham. The book, a collection of autobiographical essays, lists, and emails, was released in hardcover by Random House on September 30, 2014, and in paperback on October 20, 2015.

== Publication history ==
Random House purchased the rights to the essay collection in October 2012 after a bidding war generated by Dunham's 66-page book proposal. Bidding was reported to have risen past $3.5 million. Not That Kind of Girl was published September 30, 2014. The book is dedicated to Nora Ephron.

== Reception ==
Not That Kind of Girl received mixed reviews but was a commercial success, reaching number two on The New York Times Best Seller list on October 19, 2014.

Sloane Crosley for The New York Times said the book was often hilarious but not ground-breaking in content. Crosley cautioned that attempts to view Dunham as a bellwether of modern feminism would unfairly overshadow the author. Hadley Freeman, in a review for The Guardian, described Dunham as being a smart and talented writer, and the book as being brutally honest, but also narcissistic and thin in experience. In The New Republic, James Wolcott found the book filled with "chatty punch lines, airy anecdotage, and sour kiss-offs" and, ultimately, "callow, grating, and glibly nattering."

Heidi Stevens of PopMatters wrote, "But the book, as a whole, is a lovely, touching, surprisingly sentimental portrait of a woman who, despite repeatedly baring her body and soul to audiences, remains a bit of an enigma: a young woman who sets the agenda, defies classification and seems utterly at home in her own skin." Leah Greenblatt of Entertainment Weekly gave the book a "B+" and that it was "guided mostly by a Woody-Allen-with-a-uterus kind of whimsy."

== Controversy ==
In November 2014, Dunham and the book became a subject of controversy following a profile of Dunham by conservative political commentator Kevin D. Williamson published in National Review. In her book, Dunham describes examining her sibling Cyrus's genitals when they were children out of curiosity, bribing them with candy for kisses and casually masturbating while lying in bed next to them. Williamson characterizes this as sexual abuse, but Lena, Cyrus, and child psychologists, sexual abuse experts, and researchers in human sexuality have rejected this notion.

In an interview about the controversy in Slate magazine's XX Factor blog, developmental psychologist Ritch Savin-Williams says that the cited passages do not indicate abuse and that "Children have been doing this stuff forever and ever and ever and ever, and they will do it forever and ever and ever." Child sexual abuse expert David Finkelhor said that a judgement requires more than a single incident, and psychologist Sharon Lamb opined that the incidents described in the book were "within the norms of childhood sexual behavior."

Dunham later apologized for some of the wording in the book, specifically the joking use of the term "sexual predator", which she described as insensitive.
