= Peter Halley =

American artist (born 1953)

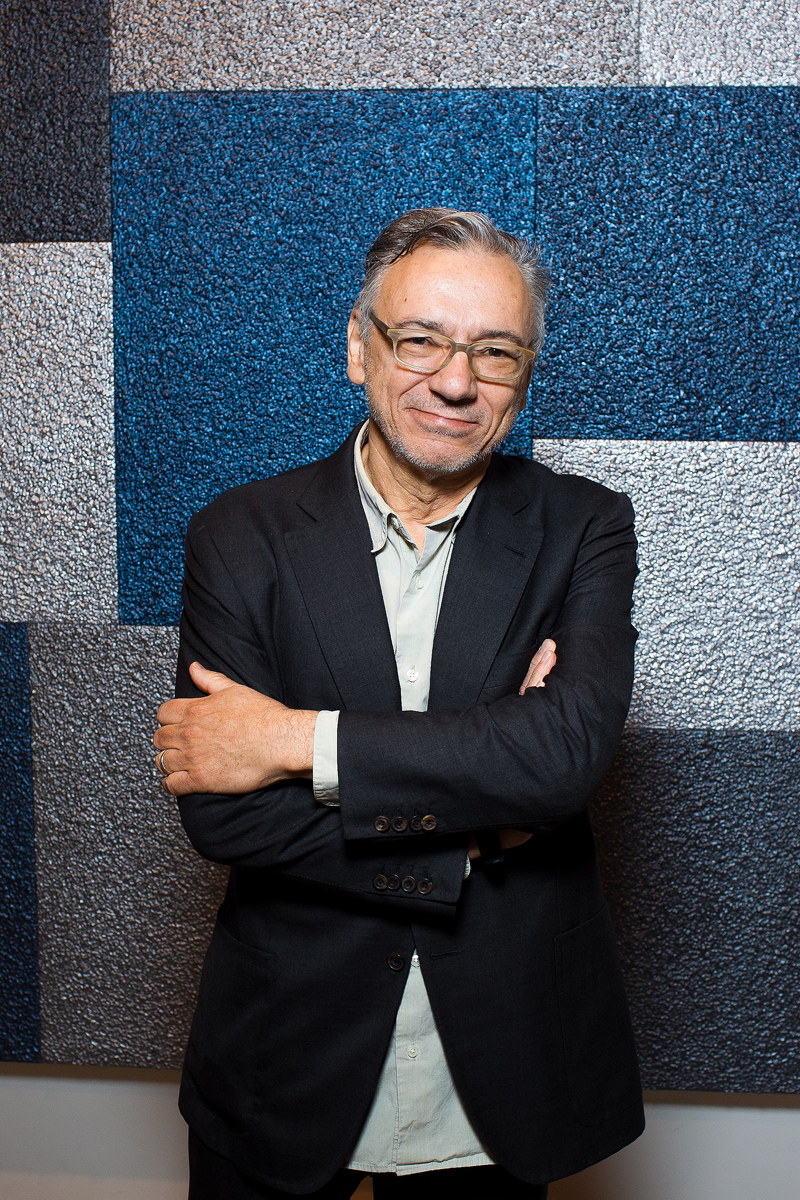
- Peter Halley in 2017
- Born: 1953 (age 72–73); New York City
- Education: Yale University; University of New Orleans
- Known for: Painting, Abstract art, Printmaking
- Movement: Minimalism, Neo Geo
- Awards: Frank Jewett Mather Award (2001); Chevalier of the Ordre des Arts et des Lettres (2025)

Peter Halley (born 1953) is an American artist and a central figure in the Neo-Conceptualist movement of the 1980s. Known for his Day-Glo geometric paintings, Halley is also a writer, the former publisher of index Magazine, and a teacher; he served as director of graduate studies in painting and printmaking at the Yale University School of Art from 2002 to 2011. Halley lives and works in New York City, and remains an influential figure in contemporary art.

== Introduction ==
Halley came to prominence as an artist in the mid-1980s, as part of the generation of Neo-Conceptualist artists that first exhibited in New York's East Village, including Jeff Koons, Haim Steinbach, Sarah Charlesworth, Annette Lemieux, Steven Parrino, Phillip Taaffe, and Gretchen Bender.

Halley's paintings explore both the physical and psychological structures of social space; he connects the hermetic language of geometric abstraction—as practiced by artists such as Barnett Newman and Ellsworth Kelly—to the actualities of urban space and the digital landscape. In the 1990s, he expanded his practice to include public installations based around the technology of large-scale digital prints.

Halley is also known for his critical writings, which, beginning in the 1980s, linked the ideas of French Post-Structuralist theorists including Michel Foucault and Jean Baudrillard to the digital revolution and the visual arts. From 1996 to 2005, Halley published Index Magazine, which featured in-depth interviews with emergent and established figures in fashion, music, film, and other creative fields. Having also taught art in several graduate programs, Halley became the director of graduate studies in painting and printmaking at the Yale University School of Art, serving from 2002 to 2011.

=== Early life and education ===
Halley was born and raised in New York City. He is the son of Janice Halley, a registered nurse of Polish ancestry, and Rudolph Halley, an attorney and politician of German-Austrian Jewish descent. In 1951, Rudolph "became an instant celebrity," as Halley has said, while serving as chief prosecutor for the United States Senate Special Committee to Investigate Crime in Interstate Commerce, also known as the Kefauver Committee (after Senator Estes Kefauver). "This series of hearings with various colorful mobsters was broadcast on television all over the country," Halley notes. Rudolph was also assistant counsel to the wartime Truman Committee, investigating fraud and waste in defense contracting. He served as president of the New York City Council from 1951 to 1953, and unsuccessfully ran for New York City Mayor in 1953. He died soon after at the age of forty-three, when Halley was three years old.

Other notable family members include Rudolph's first cousin Carl Solomon (1928–1993), to whom Allen Ginsberg dedicated his epic poem "Howl (for Carl Solomon)" in 1955. Halley is also related to Samuel Shipman (1884–1937), a well-known and colorful writer of Broadway comedies in the 1920s. Halley's great aunt and uncle, Rose and A.A. Wyn, published Ace Comics from 1940 to 1956 and Ace Books from 1952 to 1973. Ace Books was an American publisher of science fiction that published William Burroughs's first novel, Junkie, in 1953, as well as the first novels by several prominent science-fiction writers including Philip K. Dick, Samuel R. Delany, and Ursula K. Le Guin.

A precocious child, Peter started first grade at Manhattan's Hunter College Elementary School at the age of 5. He later attended Phillips Academy in Andover, Massachusetts, a prep school known for its art museum and, at the time, innovative art program. While at Andover, Halley took an interest in various forms of media and became the programming director for the school's low-wattage radio station. It was also during this time that he began painting, making his first works in his great uncle Aaron's art studio.

He received college acceptances with full scholarships from Brown, Harvard, and Yale, but chose to study at Yale because of their renowned art program. But, after his sophomore year, Halley was denied entry into the art major and decided to move to New Orleans, where he lived for one year. He returned to Yale the following year to study art history, and wrote his senior thesis on Henri Matisse before graduating in 1975. After graduation, Halley returned to New Orleans and, in 1976, enrolled in the University of New Orleans MFA program. He received his MFA in 1978 and lived in New Orleans until 1980 (also traveling to Mexico, Central America, Europe, and North Africa during this time).

== Career ==
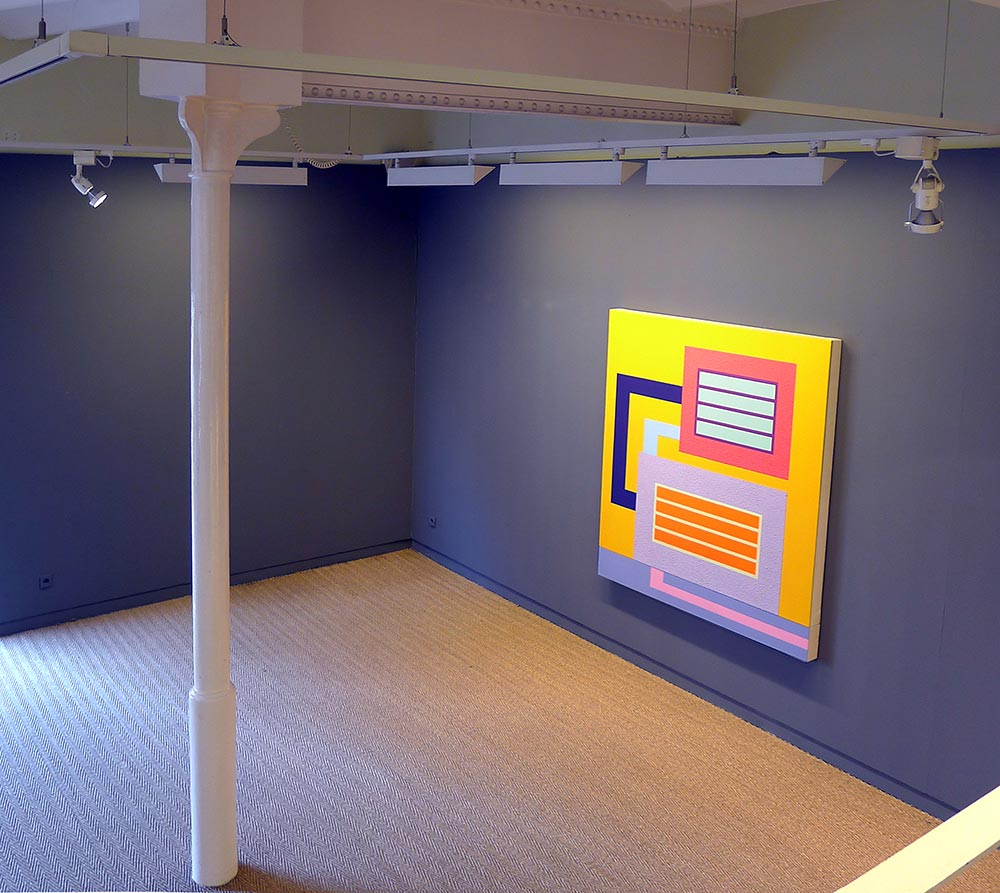
Prison (Galeria Senda, Barcelona)

=== Early career and New York City ===
In 1980, Halley returned to New York City and moved into a loft on East 7th Street in the East Village, Manhattan; there, Talking Heads frontman David Byrne was his upstairs neighbor. New York City had a lasting influence on Halley's distinct painting style. He became enamored with the city's intensity, scale, and three-dimensional urban grid—the "geometricization of space that pervaded the 20th century." Likewise interested in abstract painting, Halley "set out to connect the language of geometric abstraction to the actual space that he saw all around him, transforming the square—borrowed from Malevich, Albers, and others—into architectural icons he called 'prisons' and 'cells,' and connecting them by straight lines called 'conduits.'"

These particular geometric icons, which he developed in the early 1980s in the midst of a global technology boom, became the basis of Halley's painting for the decades to come. Halley derived his language not just from the urban grid but from the gridded networks permeating all facets of the contemporary "media-controlled, post-industrial world." With this background, the "cells" could be seen as "images of confinement and as cellular units in the scientific sense," according to Calvin Tomkins. The "conduits"—the lines connect various "cells" and other geometric patterns in a given work—represent the supports of "underlying informational and structural components of contemporary society," Amy Brandt writes. "Halley wished to incite public awareness of the confining, underlying structures of industrialized society and commodity capitalism."

In addition to urban structures such as modernist buildings and subways, Halley drew influence from the pop themes and social issues associated with new wave music. He took the modernist grid of previous abstract painting—namely, according to Brandt, the work of Frank Stella—and amplified its colors and impact in accordance with the postmodern times. During this early period, Halley employed new colors and materials with specific connotations. He began to use fluorescent Day-Glo paint, which has an uncanny glow that recalls the artificial lights of postmodern society and the bright government-issued signs that mark streets and workers' clothing. Halley also uses Day-Glo colors in response to developments in modernist painting—a "hyperrealization" of art-historical motifs, in Halley terms (following Jean Baudrillard)—and as a means of delineating space on his canvases.

Halley also began to employ Roll-a-Tex, a textural additive that gives his "cells" and "prisons" a tactile, architectural quality, as Roll-a-Tex is most often used as surfacing in buildings such as suburban homes and motels. The postmodern, commodity-like color and texture, not to mention the thickness, of Halley's canvases entered them into the art-historical conversation surrounding painting and objecthood. The mixture of harsh colors and textures at once "seduce[s] and repel[s] viewers with assaults on their senses of sight and touch."

In the 1980s, Halley's practice and career developed amid the artistic and intellectual discourse that arose in East Village artist-run galleries like International with Monument, Cash/Newhouse, and Nature Morte. These spaces were a community for artists such as Halley, Jeff Koons, Haim Steinbach, Sherrie Levine, Ashley Bickerton, and Richard Prince, who "shared a focus on the role of technology in postmodern society and rejected nature as a touchstone of meaning." (Bob Nickas, Dan Cameron, and the curatorial team Tricia Collins and Richard Milazzo were curators and critics associated with this scene.) These artists used irony and pastiche to subvert and comment upon structural issues of the time; they drew from Conceptual Art to create "paintings and sculptures that operated as a set of pictorial signs referencing artists and moments in postwar art history," expanding their boundaries as artists to also encompass the theoretical discourse around the art objects themselves.

Halley staged solo projects at PS122 Gallery in 1980 and at the East Village bar Beulah Land in 1984. In 1983 he organized a show at the John Weber Gallery, Science Fiction, which included, among others, Jeff Koons as well as Ross Bleckner, Richard Prince, Taro Suzuki, Robert Smithson, and Donald Judd, the latter of whom had been an influence on Halley. Alison Pearlman described the relevance and influence of the show, writing:

The gallery presentation dramatized a pop-futuristic sensibility. To begin, the space was painted entirely black. Because many of the works incorporated geometric shapes, Plexiglas and lights, some flashing or rotating, the total effect was crystalline like a Star Trek idea of Peter Halley, Jeff Koons, and the Art at Marketing ... This high-tech sensibility has been common in popular science fiction as well as fashion, music, and other consumer products made to look geometricizing, streamlined, synthetic, or otherwise ultra-urban. The aesthetic coincides with actual fashions of the early 1980s.

Halley's first larger one-person exhibition came in 1985 at International with Monument, a gallery at the heart of the East Village scene run by Meyer Vaisman, Kent Klamen, and Elizabeth Koury, who had all met at the Parsons School of Design. Around this time, Halley introduced Jeff Koons to Vaisman, and Koons subsequently exhibited at International with Monument as well.

In October 1986, Vaisman organized a group show at New York's more established Sonnabend Gallery that featured work by Halley, Ashley Bickerton, Jeff Koons, and Vaisman himself. Embodying the intellectual style that had been established by International with Monument, the show marked a departure from the painterly style of Neo-Expressionism, the dominant style in New York's art scene of the earlier 1980s. The exhibition at Sonnabend received popular and critical attention, and the four artists became identified on a wider scale with the labels "Neo-Geo" and "Neo-Conceptualism." In New York magazine Kay Larson called the artists "Masters of Hype," while in the same magazine a month earlier, Paul Taylor had dubbed them "The Hot Four" and called Halley the "intellectual of the group." Roberta Smith wrote in the New York Times that "Halley's geometric abstractions suggest diagrams of battery cells with conduits or prison cells with barred windows (that is, electrical or social systems), while their powerful fluorescent colors come from somewhere beyond art."

Following the 1986 exhibition at Sonnabend Gallery, Halley’s reputation expanded rapidly beyond New York. His first European solo gallery exhibition took place at Galerie Daniel Templon in Paris in 1986, followed by solo exhibitions with Jablonka Galerie in Cologne, Lia Rumma in Naples, and Bruno Bischofberger in Zurich. His work also appeared in major international group exhibitions, including Documenta 8 in Kassel and Terrae Motus at the Grand Palais in Paris, as well as exhibitions organized by influential New York curators Tricia Collins and Richard Milazzo. Together, these exhibitions brought Halley’s work into a broader European conversation about geometric abstraction, postindustrial society, and contemporary culture.

This growing network of galleries, curators, and institutions soon led to sustained museum recognition. In 1989, Museum Haus Esters in Krefeld, Germany, presented Peter Halley: Recent Paintings, his first museum survey, which subsequently traveled to the Maison de la Culture et de la Communication in Saint-Étienne, France and the Institute of Contemporary Arts in London. In 1991–1992, CAPC Musée d’Art Contemporain in Bordeaux mounted an extensive retrospective of Halley’s work that traveled to FAE Musee d'Art Contemporain in Lausanne, the Museo Nacional Centro de Arte Reina Sofía in Madrid, and the Stedelijk Museum in Amsterdam. These exhibitions established a durable international audience for Halley’s work and marked his emergence from a leading figure in New York’s 1980s art scene to an artist with a significant internationally institutionalized presence.

=== Writing ===
As he began his art career, Halley became interested in the French Post-Structuralist writers, including Michel Foucault, Roland Barthes, Paul Virilio, and Jean Baudrillard, many of whose works were translated into English in the late 1970s and early 1980s and were being discussed among New York intellectuals. The ideas of the French writers informed Halley's use of synthetic colors and materials in his painting, and also the writing that he began to produce around the same time. "The modernism I grew up with was that it was spiritual," Halley said, "it was about a kind of purity and Emersonian transcendentalism ... Feeling less and less comfortable with that, I decided that for me modernism was really about skepticism, doubt, and questioning. Things that we now say are part of a postmodern sensibility."

Halley put forth such ideas on modernism, postmodernism, culture, and the digital revolution—derived in part from Foucault, Baudrillard, and others, and with a neo-Marxist slant—in his numerous writings. He published his first essay "Beat, Minimalism, New Wave, and Robert Smithson" in 1981 in Arts Magazine, a New York-based publication that published seven more of his essays throughout that decade. In his essays, published from the 1980s to early 2000s, Halley makes reference to the shifting relationship between the individual and larger social structures, and how artists of his generation responded to the emerging social, economic, and cultural conditions of the 1980s and 1990s. Halley highlighted the various roles of new wave music, Cold War cultural politics, and the increased digitization of experience brought about by computers and video games. Additionally, he provided a critical overview of contemporary art during this period through examining a range of sources including the social theories of José Ortega y Gasset, Norbert Elias, and Richard Sennett.

==== Bibliography ====
- Peter Halley, "Selected Essays 1981-2001", Edgewise Press, N.Y, 2013. ISBN 9781893207264
- Peter Halley, "Collected Essays, 1981-87", Bruno Bischofberger, 1988. ISBN 0-932499-68-6
- Peter Halley, "Recent Essays 1990-1996", Edgewise Press, N.Y, 1997. ISBN 0-9646466-1-7

=== Artwork from the 1990s to the present ===
In the 1990s, in response to the changes in communications and media caused by the digital revolution, Halley adapted his visual language to the effects of the digital revolution in the 1990s. The "conduits" that marked his painting began to multiply and increase in complexity, and he began to add pearlescent and metallic paints to his Day-Glo color palette of the 1980s. "My earlier paintings were rational, diagrammatic, and logical," he said in a 1995 interview with Flash Art, explaining the difference between his '80s and subsequent outputs. "Then I made a break around 1990, and since then they've become really exaggerated, almost parodic; and they aren't analytical at all. In any case, I don't see a great formal break in the '90s, although there is a psychological break." Around 1990 Halley began producing bas-reliefs, many of them hollow and constructed from fiberglass. Soon after, he began experimenting with digital printing and web-based art.

In 1993, Halley created Superdream Mutation, a digital print available for viewing and downloading on the web bulletin board-style platform The Thing. The piece, a monochrome image, was distributed as a GIF—and is considered to be the first artwork exclusively available for online viewing and sale (for twenty dollars). Regarding this work, Halley highlighted his thought process and the way in which the digital work related to his painting: "I set up the matrix and the person has certain choices within it. It's also based on a Jasper Johns print edition from the mid-sixties, in which there was a line drawing of a target, and a little box of water colors. It was a kit. Another factor for the Web project was my skepticism about the notion of 'interactivity' on the computer. Most decisions are choices between two paths; binary decisions are the only possible ones with computers. So I wanted to do something in which the choices were very mechanistic." Halley did another online project called Exploding Cell with the Museum of Modern Art, New York, on the occasion of his 1997 exhibition New Concepts in Printmaking 1: Peter Halley, a one-person show that highlighted Halley's print and installation practices. Exploding Cell was published online at the time and is still available to the public. Glenn Lowry, director of the museum, has stated that this was MoMA's first digital acquisition.

Throughout the twenty-first century, Halley has continued to employ his iconic "cells," "prisons" and "conduits" in his painting, as his primary subject remains the organization of social space. But, Halley explained in 2011, "the nature of the social space we live in has changed immensely in the last thirty years since my project began. When I started my work in the '80s, the limits of communications technology were the telephone, the fax machine, and cable television. In a very short time, we've gone from the era of limited, linear communications to the epoch of the web, Google, and Facebook."

=== Digital prints and installations ===
In the mid-1990s, Halley started to produce site-specific installations for museums, galleries, and public spaces that would interact with the surrounding architecture. Halley began using Adobe Illustrator as a means of developing his compositions. He also began to explore printmaking, using a variety of techniques including silkscreen, digital, and inkjet printing. In his prints, Halley often includes comic book imagery as well as a new motif of explosions and exploding cells, often made through printing images from the computer.

His installations mix imagery and media such as painting, fiberglass relief sculpture, wall-size flowcharts, and digitally generated wallpaper. Halley created his first site-specific installation at the Dallas Museum of Art; this installation included paintings, silkscreen prints, wallpaper, and murals of flow charts and other images.

Other notable installations include at Museum Folkwang, Essen, in 1999, and Disjecta, Portland, in 2012, as well as "Judgment Day," an installation of digital prints for the exhibition, Personal Structures, at the 54th Venice Biennale in 2011. In 2016, he exhibited The Schirn Ring, a large, multi-part installation at Schirn Kunsthalle, Frankfurt, Germany.

Halley has created several permanent works in public spaces. In 2002, Halley was commissioned by architects Abalos and Herreros for their recently completed public library in a working-class neighborhood populated by university students in the district of Usera, in Madrid. The architects wanted to cover the interior walls with text imagery and invited Halley to undertake the project. Halley designed wall murals using the text from Jorge Luis Borges’ story, La Biblioteca de Babel. He digitally mutated the text until it achieved a look he describes as ‘futuristic Arabic typography.’ Halley was fascinated by how Borges’ text, though written in European letters, gained the aspect of Arab calligraphy, referencing the Moorish rule in Spain that ended four hundred and fifty years ago. In 2005, he was commissioned to make a 17-by-40-foot painting consisting of a grid of eight individual panels, for the Dallas/Fort Worth International Airport, Texas. Three years later, in 2008, he completed a permanent installation of digital prints extending over five floors for the Gallatin School of Individualized Study at New York University~~.~~ In 2018, Halley had a show of paintings at the Lever House on Park Avenue in New York City. The show included paintings with fluorescent geometric forms, in canvases that were not square, but which had rectilinear outlines. The show also included an installation of Halley's "exploding cells". Halley created an installation for the show in the exterior-facing windows of the Lever House, in which the light exuding from the windows was tinted fluorescent chartreuse. The installation included a dance piece by Jessie Gold of Movement Research, in which dancers in the exterior-facing windows performed for an audience below.

Halley's longstanding interest in design has led to collaborative installations with international designers, creating a compelling dialogue between fine art and design. In 2007 he collaborated with French designer Matali Crasset on an installation at Galerie Thaddaeus Ropac, Paris, France; and with Italian architect Alessandro Mendini at Galleria Massimo Minini, Brescia, Italy, and at Mary Boone Gallery, New York.

== Index Magazine ==
In 1996, Halley and Bob Nickas, a curator and writer, co-founded index, a magazine inspired by Andy Warhol's Interview that featured interviews with people in various creative fields. Halley ran index from his New York studio. The magazine often employed rising photographers like Juergen Teller, Terry Richardson, Wolfgang Tillmans, and Ryan McGinley, and ran interviews with artists of diverse media like Björk, Brian Eno, Marc Jacobs, Agnes b., Diamanda Galas, Harmony Korine, and Scarlett Johansson. Halley stopped production of index in 2005. In 2014, Rizzoli published Index A to Z: Art, Design, Fashion, Film, and Music in the Indie Era, which documents the magazine's run as well as that era's cultural movements.

== Teaching ==
Halley has taught and lectured at universities continuously throughout his career, both in the United States and abroad, including LMU Munich, Beaux-Arts de Paris, Academy of Fine Arts Vienna, Harvard University, and Hunter College of Art. In the late 1990s, Halley taught in the graduate art programs at Columbia University, UCLA, and Yale University. From 2002 to 2011, he served as director of graduate studies for painting and printmaking at the Yale School of Art.

From 2010 to 2011, he was appointed as an endowed chair, the Leffingwell Professor of Painting, at Yale School of Art.

== Personal life ==
Halley has been married twice. Both of which have ended in divorce. He has two children, Isabel Halley, a ceramicist, and Thomas Halley, a pre-school teacher.
