= List of ships named Maria =

Numerous vessels have borne the name Maria:

- Maria (1795 ship) was launched at Plymouth. She made one voyage to Bengal for the British East India Company (EIC). She is last listed in 1815.
- Maria (1798 ship) was launched at Gainsborough and traded with the West Indies and later with Quebec. She made two voyages transporting convicts to Australia, one to Port Jackson and one to Hobart. She was last listed in 1833.
- Maria (1804 ship) was built at Calcutta. She made one voyage from Calcutta to London for the EIC. She was captured in 1807 and her captors sold her to Arab merchants who renamed her Derreak Beggie. She then became Ruby, and foundered in 1838.
- Maria (1823 ship), launched in Ireland in 1823, shipwrecked off Cape Jaffa in South Australia July 1840, with all survivors massacred.
- Maria (1836 ship) was launched at Yarmouth. Maria was originally used on the England to Bombay run in the 1830s. She sank on 23 July 1851 near Cape Terawhiti on the North Island of New Zealand.
- Maria (1962 ship) was launched under number 279 at Scheepswerf Vooruit in Zaandam (ID KW 202). Later names were Waterman II, Jonas, Telco Suez, Alk Explorer and Iuventa, owned since 2016 by Jugend Rettet
