= Criminalization of sea rescue in the Mediterranean =

The criminalization of sea rescue in the Mediterranean refers to the increase in policing of individuals and search and rescue (SAR) NGOs aiding migrants in the Mediterranean Sea. It further encompasses the increase in de-legitimisation attempts of SAR NGOs by governments, high-profile politicians and officials.

== Background ==
Between 2014 and 2022, the number of recorded deaths of migrants seeking to cross the Mediterranean to reach European shores is estimated at 25,716 deaths, with the true number of lost lives expected to be higher. Numerous scholars and activists often refer to the Mediterranean Sea as a graveyard for people seeking refuge as well as "the world’s deadliest border". Over the past years, NGOs operating in large-scale rescue missions in the region have increasingly become targets of de-legitimisation and criminalization attempts by Frontex, European governments, high level politicians and officials, as well as the media.

== Developments of criminalization of sea rescue ==
By the end of 2016, Frontex classified NGO activity in the Mediterranean as a pull factor for migrants and smugglers, with significant implications and challenges for both border control as well as SAR activities. Prominent Italian politicians and officials accused NGOs of colluding with human traffickers, additionally alleging that certain organisations were financed by smugglers. These allegations were strongly denied by activists, and researchers widely highlight a lack of evidence for such claims.

Italy's far-right politician Matteo Salvini is a further prominent voice in attempting to halt NGO activity in the Mediterranean. He called for the arrest of NGO crews operating in the region and suggested deliberately sinking their vessels in an attempt to stop their SAR activities. In July 2017, following threats to close its ports to NGO vessels, the Italian government introduced a code of conduct aimed at regulating the activities of non-governmental organizations involved in search and rescue operations in the Mediterranean. The implementation of the code was mandatory in order for NGOs to continue their operations in the region. The code of conduct specifies that NGOs are prohibited from entering Libyan waters for migrant operations, that they must accept military and police personnel on board, and that they no longer are allowed to transfer rescued people to other vessels at sea, mandating rescue crews to return to port to disembark.

Representatives from multiple NGOs, including Médecins Sans Frontières (MSF), Sea-Watch and Jugend Rettet, as well as scholars, condemned the code of conduct for challenging their fundamental principles and infringing on NGOs’ abilities to conduct life-saving operations at sea. MOAS, Save the Children and Proactiva Open Arms were the first to sign the code of conduct, while MSF, Sea-Watch and Jugend Rettet, among others, initially refused. Consequently, the Italian government seized and impounded Jugend Rettet's vessel, accusing the NGO of colluding with Libyan smugglers. Shortly thereafter, Italy and Malta, nonetheless, denied permission to Proactiva's ship to allow three rescued Libyan migrants to disembark. In addition to criminalization attempts by European governments, acts of hostility by the Libyan Coast Guard against SAR NGOs further impede their life-saving operations and put the safety of their crews at risk, resulting in numerous NGOs halting their operations and temporarily withdrawing from the Mediterranean.

In early 2023, the Italian government introduced a new set of rules to the code of conduct. The new rules include banning NGO vessels from conducting multiple rescues at sea and requiring them to disclose additional information about their rescue operations.

== Prominent cases of criminalizing NGO personnel ==
In June 2022, the European Union Agency for Fundamental Rights (FRA) reported that since 2016, Germany, Greece, Italy, Spain, Malta and the Netherlands had initiated 60 criminal and administrative proceedings against NGOs carrying out search and rescue operations. In addition to the proceedings against crew members and rescue vessels, the FRA reports that since 2018, national authorities have increasingly tried to restrict access to European ports, which resulted in delays in disembarkation, leaving rescued people at sea for more than 24 hours, before being allowed to access a safe port.

=== Carola Rackete ===
Carola Rackete is a German captain and conservation scientist who, in 2019, volunteered with the German NGO Sea-Watch in the Mediterranean sea. In June 2019, their vessel Sea-Watch 3, with 53 rescued people and 22 crew members on board, spent two weeks in international waters, without permission to disembark at the closest Italian port in Lampedusa. The NGO had refused the Libyan Coast Guard’s request to dock at Tripoli, which is considered unsafe by the EU and humanitarian organizations. Following a significant deterioration of the conditions and health of those on board after 16 days at sea, Rackete declared a state of emergency and made the decision to defy the Italian authorities’ refusal, and docked in Lampedusa. Consequently, Rackete was taken into custody and placed under house arrest, and the rescue vessel was impounded. In December 2021, the Italian authorities dropped the last charges against Rackete.

=== Pia Klemp ===
Pia Klemp is a German human rights activist and biologist. From 2016 to 2018 she captained two rescue vessels in the Mediterranean for Sea-Watch and Jugend Rettet. After the ship Iuventa was seized by Italian authorities in 2017, Klemp, along with 9 crew members, was accused of cooperating with human traffickers and faced up to 20 years in prison. The charges against her were ultimately dropped, after amassing legal fees of hundreds of thousands of Euros.

=== Sara Mardini and Seán Binder ===
Sara Mardini, a former Syrian competitive swimmer and human rights activist, and Seán Binder, a German-Irish human rights activist and rescue diver, were jailed in August 2018 for aiding in the rescue of migrants on the island of Lesbos, Greece. More than four years after the initial arrest, they had their case heard in court along with 22 other volunteers, in what is being coined as the "largest case of criminalization of solidarity in Europe".

== See also ==
- 2015 migrant crisis
- Frontex controversies
- Seebrücke
- Watch The Med Alarm Phone Project
- No Border Network
- Mediterranea Saving Humans
- SOS Méditerranée
- Sea-Eye
- Libyan Coast Guard
