= 23 000 Lives =

- 23 000 Leben
- Directed by: Markus Goller
- Screenplay by: Oliver Ziegenbalg, Michele Cinque
- Produced by: Christopher Zwickler, Oliver Ziegenbalg, Markus Goller
- Starring: Louis Hofmann; Mala Emde; Katharina Stark; Frederick Lau; Maria Dragus; Trevor Magaya; Kathy Etoa; Felice; Saibon Wang; Joone Dankou; Merlin von Garnier; Luisa-Céline Gaffron; Omid Memar; Eleonora Romandini; Franka Potente
- Cinematography: Frankie DeMarco
- Music by: Volker Bertelmann
- Release date: 17 July 2026
- Running time: 112 minutes
- Country: Germany
- Language: German

23 000 Lives (German: 23 000 Leben) is a German film drama directed by Markus Goller, released worldwide on Netflix on 17 July 2026. The film tells the story of the search-and-rescue ship Iuventa, which operated in the central Mediterranean Sea in 2016 and 2017 before being seized by Italian authorities. According to Jugend Rettet, the Iuventa crew took part in the rescue of more than 23,000 people over 16 missions. This is the origin of the film's title.

== Plot ==
Berlin, 2015, the "summer of migration": a group of young people follow the news from the Mediterranean with growing dismay. Thousands are attempting to reach Europe from Libya on overcrowded rubber boats, while state rescue missions have been discontinued and little help is available on the ground. Together with his girlfriend Kitty, his pragmatic roommate Nina, and photographer Mauro, Lukas hatches an unlikely plan: they found the organization "Jugend Rettet," launch a crowdfunding campaign, and spend months searching for a suitable ship, enduring countless setbacks along the way. Once the ship and funding are finally secured, the project gains momentum. At a shipyard in Emden, Lukas, Nina, Mauro, and dozens of volunteers restore the old trawler themselves; Volkswagen mechanics who read about electrical problems on Facebook stop by spontaneously to help. It is in Emden that the ship receives its name: Iuventa, Latin for youth.

Within a year, the crew rescues more than 23,000 people from overcrowded and unseaworthy rubber and wooden boats, ensuring their safe arrival in Europe. What begins as a mission full of hope and determination comes under increasing political pressure: European authorities grow increasingly suspicious of civilian sea rescue, and a narrative emerges claiming that NGOs like Jugend Rettet are cooperating with smuggling networks. The rescuers are no longer seen as witnesses to a humanitarian catastrophe, but as complicit in it. In August 2017, the Iuventa is lured into the port of Lampedusa by Italian authorities and seized there. The crew is being investigated for facilitating unauthorized entry. Part of the crew flees on a sailboat.

Before the court in Trapani, Sicily, the defendants are confronted with partly fabricated evidence, including photographs allegedly showing the Iuventa towing empty boats toward the Libyan coast. Rose and Lamin, both rescued by the Iuventa, appear as defense witnesses. They testify in court about what the crew did for them and others during the crossing, and that it saved their lives. In the end, all defendants are acquitted. The judge finds that the evidence presented clearly demonstrates that the alleged crimes did not occur, and that a full trial would be superfluous. Fleeing torture, arbitrary detention, sexual violence, and abuse in Libyan detention centers, the court rules, was unavoidable.

== Production ==
=== Development and crew ===
Michele Cinque, who had already released the 2017 documentary Iuventa about the organization's work, was involved in developing the project. By contrast, 23 000 Lives is a fictionalized drama that condenses real events and people.

The film was directed by Markus Goller, with a screenplay by Oliver Ziegenbalg in collaboration with Michele Cinque. It was produced by Christopher Zwickler along with Oliver Ziegenbalg and Markus Goller, in collaboration with Lazy Film (creative producer: Michele Cinque). Cinematography was handled by Frankie DeMarco. Production design was by Oscar winner Christian Goldbeck, and the score was composed by Oscar winner Volker Bertelmann.

=== Cast ===
The lead role of Lukas is played by Louis Hofmann. He is joined by Mala Emde as his girlfriend Kitty, Katharina Stark as roommate Nina, and Felice as photographer Mauro. Other roles include Frederick Lau as Sören, Maria Dragus as Viola, Luisa-Céline Gaffron as Dominique, and Omid Memar as Askanius. Trevor Magaya and Kathy Etoa portray Lamin and Rose, two refugees rescued by the Iuventa who appear as defense witnesses during the trial. Rounding out the cast are Saibon Wang as Su, Joone Dankou as Paula, and Merlin von Garnier as Maik. Guest appearances include Corinna Harfouch, Ulrich Matthes, Franka Potente, Katja Riemann, Frank Plasberg, Herbert Knaup, and Eleonora Romandini.

Amara Krumak, one of the El Hiblu 3 – three young refugees who, in 2019, were rescued from distress at sea by the tanker El Hiblu 1 along with more than 100 others, mediated on board against the group's return to Libya, and are facing charges in Malta including terrorism – appears as an extra. He plays a person fleeing who pulls Lukas underwater in a dramatic rescue scene fighting for survival; the scene opens the film.

=== Filming ===
The film was shot in the summer of 2024 on Malta and in Berlin.

== Release ==
The world premiere took place on 29 June 2026 at the Munich Film Festival in the "Spotlight" section. The film will be available worldwide on Netflix from 17 July 2026.

== Background ==
The Iuventa began operating in the central Mediterranean in the summer of 2016. At that time, the Mediterranean had become the deadliest migration route in the world.

In August 2017, Italian authorities seized the Iuventa in the port of Lampedusa. The crew was accused of facilitating unauthorized entry and of colluding with Libyan smuggling networks to arrange direct handovers of people and the return of boats for reuse. The public prosecutor's office in Trapani, Sicily, based this accusation partly on covert investigations, including phone surveillance, bugging on board and in offices, and the use of an undercover investigator.

In January 2021, the public prosecutor's office brought charges against a total of 21 individuals and three organizations; among the accused were four Iuventa crew members. The case was seen as a precedent in the context of the increasing criminalization of civilian sea rescue in the Mediterranean. Human rights organizations, including Amnesty International and Human Rights Watch, criticized it as part of a politically motivated strategy to deter civilian rescue organizations.

The ship remained seized for seven years, deteriorating in the port of Trapani during that time. On 19 April 2024, the court in Trapani closed the case, finding no criminal conduct and ruling that fleeing conditions in Libya, and any form of assistance in doing so, had been necessary. The original text of the ruling is quoted by the judge character in the film.

Coinciding with the film's release, Jugend Rettet is pursuing a civil case against the Italian state for damages caused to the Iuventa during the seizure.

== See also ==
- Jugend Rettet
- Sea-Watch
