= Iuventa =

2016–17 Mediterranean migrant rescue ship

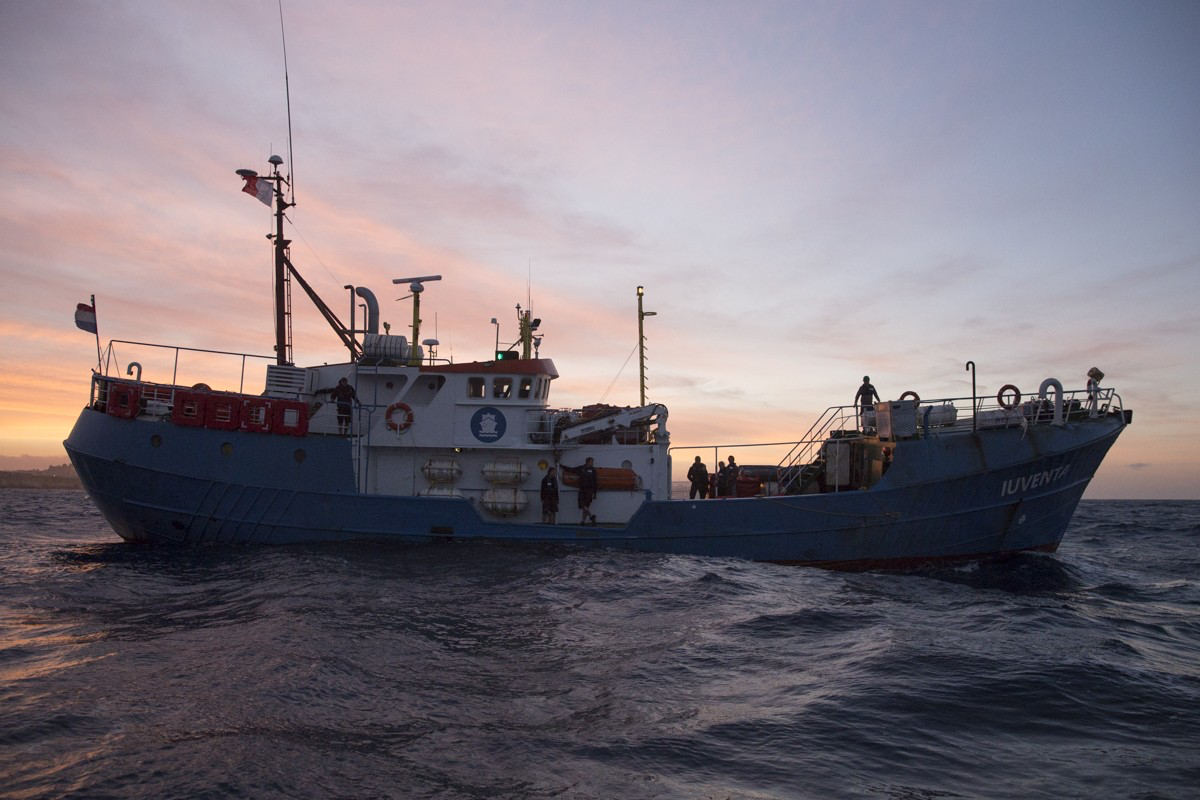

History
- Name: Iuventa
- Owner: Stichting Jugend Rettet
- Launched: 1962

General characteristics
- Tonnage: 184 GRT
- Length: 32.92 m
- Beam: 6.75 m
- Draught: 3.15 m

The Iuventa is a former fishing vessel built in 1962. From 2016 to 2017, it was deployed in the Mediterranean Sea to rescue migrants and refugees in distress at sea. In August 2017, it was seized by Italian authorities in the port of Lampedusa. After several years of investigations and criminal proceedings against crew members, the defendants were acquitted in April 2024.

According to human rights organizations such as the ECCHR and Amnesty International, this was the longest, most expensive, and most extensive criminal trial ever brought against a civilian sea rescue organization.

== History ==
=== Construction and commercial use ===
The vessel was built under hull number 279 at the Scheepswerf Vooruit shipyard in Zaandam. It entered service as Maria (fishing registration: KW 202). Later names were Waterman II from 1969 and Jonas (fishing registration: HD 202) from 1971.

In 1990, the vessel, which had until then been used for fishing, was sold and converted into an offshore standby and support vessel. Renamed Telco Suez, the ship was used in the construction of offshore wind farms. At the end of 2001, it was sold again and renamed Alk Explorer.

=== Conversion and deployment for search & rescue ===
In June 2016, the vessel came into the possession of the organisation Jugend Rettet, which had it converted for search and rescue operations in June of that year by the Emder Werft- und Dockbetriebe shipyard. It subsequently operated in the Mediterranean, assisting refugees in distress at sea.

== Investigation and criminal proceedings ==
=== Seizure of the ship ===
In August 2017, the Iuventa, under the command of Pia Klemp, was seized by Italian authorities in the port of Lampedusa. Crew members were accused of having provided "aiding and abetting illegal immigration" and of having cooperated with smugglers to that end.

=== Investigation and Charges ===
Investigators, led by prosecutors Ambrogio Cartosio and Andrea Tarondo, had been looking into alleged links between crew members and smugglers since October 2016. They submitted a 650-page report which accused the crew of cooperating with smugglers and of deliberately taking migrants on board a few kilometres off the North African coast without those migrants being in distress at sea. The accusations relied, among other things, on recordings from listening devices previously planted on the ship, intercepted telephone conversations, and observations of individual rescue operations by investigators. The authorities also wiretapped the phones of journalists and lawyers, which was widely criticised as unlawful.

Substantial parts of the investigation relied on the statements and the covertly taken photographs and audio recordings of private security personnel deployed aboard the Save the Children ship Vos Hestia. They passed their observations on to Italian investigators as well as to political parties. Even before the trial began, the main witness qualified his earlier conclusions in an interview. He conceded that he could provide no direct evidence of any arrangement or cooperation between the crew of the Iuventa and smuggling networks, and that his statements were based on interpretation. By his own account, the Lega had, in return for his testimony, held out the prospect of a job for him.

== Dismissal of proceedings and acquittal ==
On 19 April 2024, the crew was acquitted at the request of the public prosecutor's office. The judge found that, within a "one-sided evidentiary context", the investigators had overemphasised aspects of "limited evidentiary value" and had relied on "laconic interrogation records" without adequately weighing other evidence.

He gave the following reasons for his ruling:

Gli elementi probatori esposti depongono, in termini di assoluta chiarezza e completezza, per l'insussistenza dei reati contestati agli imputati […] il materiale probatorio acquisito, anche nel corso dell'udienza preliminare, è insuscettibile di completamento e non potrebbe essere ulteriormente sviluppato nella direzione accusatoria. Pertanto, il giudizio dibattimentale sarebbe del tutto superfluo. […] La fuga da torture, detenzioni arbitrarie, violenze sessuali, maltrattamenti, sfruttamento sessuale e lavorativo, privazioni delle necessità umane primarie (beni alimentari e cure mediche) è chiaramente indicativa dell'inevitabilità di sottrarsi ad una situazione di pericolo attuale di un danno grave alla persona derivante dalla permanenza nei centri di detenzione libici per migranti transitanti.

"The evidence presented demonstrates, with absolute clarity and completeness, that the offences charged against the defendants do not exist […] Moreover, the evidence gathered, including during the preliminary hearing, is incapable of being supplemented and could in no way be further developed in an incriminating direction. A trial would therefore be entirely superfluous. […] Flight from torture, arbitrary detention, sexual violence, mistreatment, sexual and labour exploitation, and the deprivation of basic human needs (food and medical care) is a clear indication of the unavoidability of escaping a situation of present danger of serious personal harm arising from being held in Libyan detention centres for migrants in transit."

— Tribunale di Trapani, Giudice dell'Udienza Preliminare: Sentenza n. 126/2024 of 19 April 2024

== Counter-expertise and public criticism ==
In a publication on the indictment, Amnesty International stated that the accusations were based on actions which, under international maritime law, form part of the duties of ships, and criticised in particular the lengthy duration of the proceedings as well as what it saw as the lack of any basis for criminal prosecution.

In 2018, researchers from Forensic Architecture at Goldsmiths, University of London, produced a three-dimensional simulation titled "The Seizure of the Iuventa", based on published prosecution documents and publicly available information, which refuted the accusations.

In a press release in February 2023, the UN Special Rapporteur on the situation of human rights defenders to the UN Human Rights Council, Mary Lawlor, warned against the criminalisation of human rights defenders involved in search and rescue missions in the Mediterranean. With regard to the proceedings against the Iuventa crew, the experts expressed serious concerns about the duration and justification of the prosecution and called on the Italian authorities to drop the charges and to ensure that humanitarian search and rescue is not criminalised.

== Return of the ship and damages claim ==
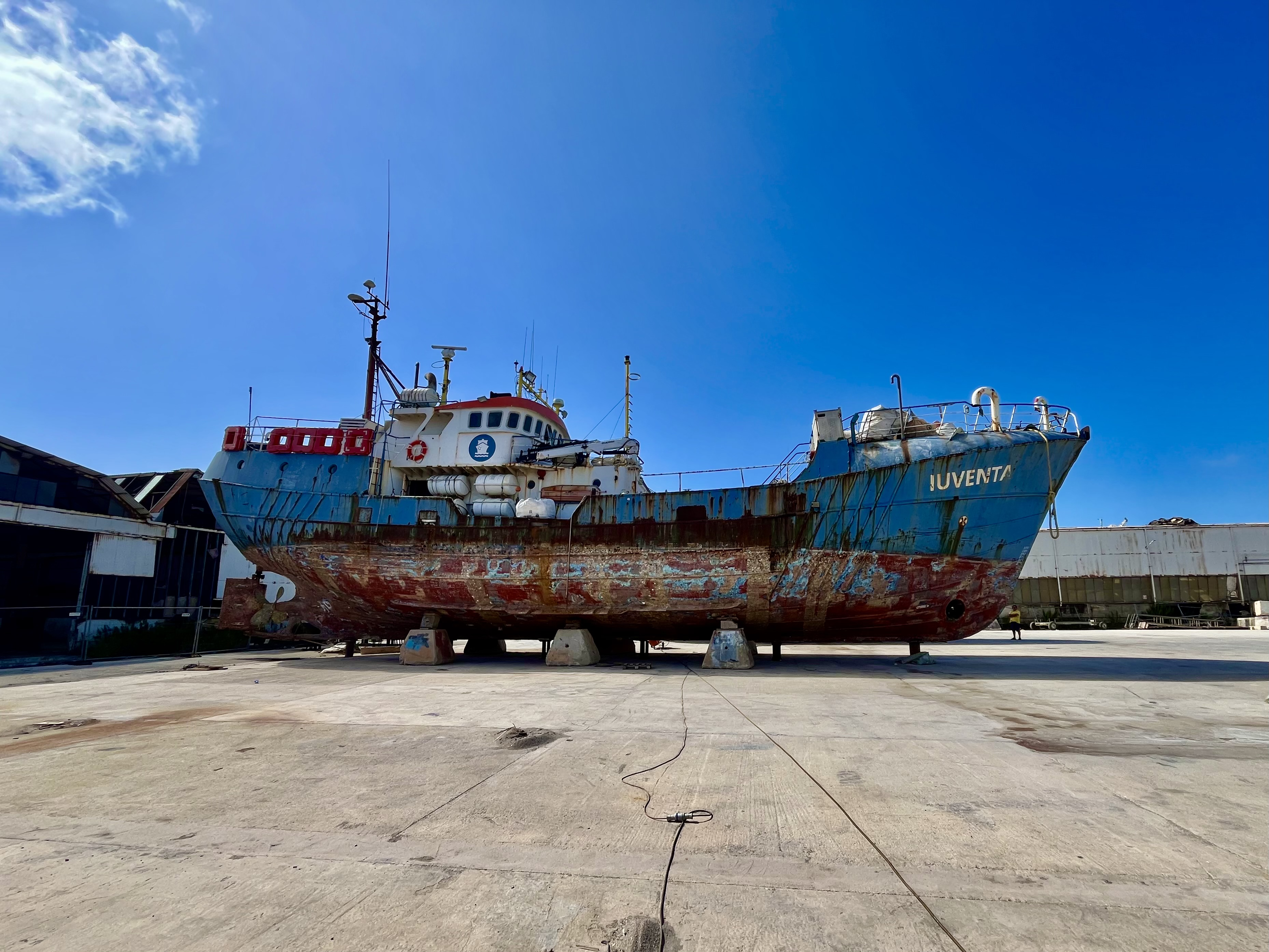
The "Iuventa" in Trapani (2025)

During its impoundment, the ship — still seaworthy in 2017 — deteriorated in the port of Trapani. Following a technical assessment commissioned by the organisation and approved by the investigating judge, the court there ordered on 8 December 2022 that the authority responsible for the seizure must restore the Iuventa to its condition prior to the seizure. Because it was at risk of sinking, the ship was lifted out of the water and brought ashore. According to the organisation, after the acquittal in 2024 the Iuventa was returned in a no longer navigable, largely destroyed condition. Jugend Rettet announced that it would sue the Italian state for damages.

== Reception ==
In July 2018, Iuventa, a feature-length documentary by Michele Cinque about the ship and its missions, was released in cinemas. In October 2024, Netflix announced a feature film called 23,000 Lives, starring Louis Hofmann, based on the story of the Iuventa, with Michele Cinque attached as creative producer.

On 10 May 2019, the crew of the Iuventa was awarded the Paul Grüninger Prize. In his laudatory address, Wolfgang Kaleck, co-founder of the European Center for Constitutional and Human Rights (ECCHR), described the proceedings as politically motivated: "The Italian judiciary has pursued political ends by deploying a disproportionately high level of criminal and police resources — this is precisely the constellation that the critical legal scholar Otto Kirchheimer described in his seminal work as Political Justice."

On 29 May 2019, captain Pia Klemp spoke about her experiences and impressions in the Mediterranean in a 15-minute special broadcast on the popular German TV show Joko and Klaas on ProSieben. Among other things, she recounted the story of a young mother whose deceased infant had to be stored in a freezer, as the Iuventa had been denied permission to dock at a safe port, even when docking might have saved the child's life.

In 2020, the ten crew members of the Iuventa under investigation by the Italian judiciary received the Amnesty International Human Rights Prize. Amnesty International called on the Italian prosecution to drop the case, on the grounds that the crew's actions had been covered by international maritime law.
