= Pia Klemp =

German biologist, ship captain and human rights activist

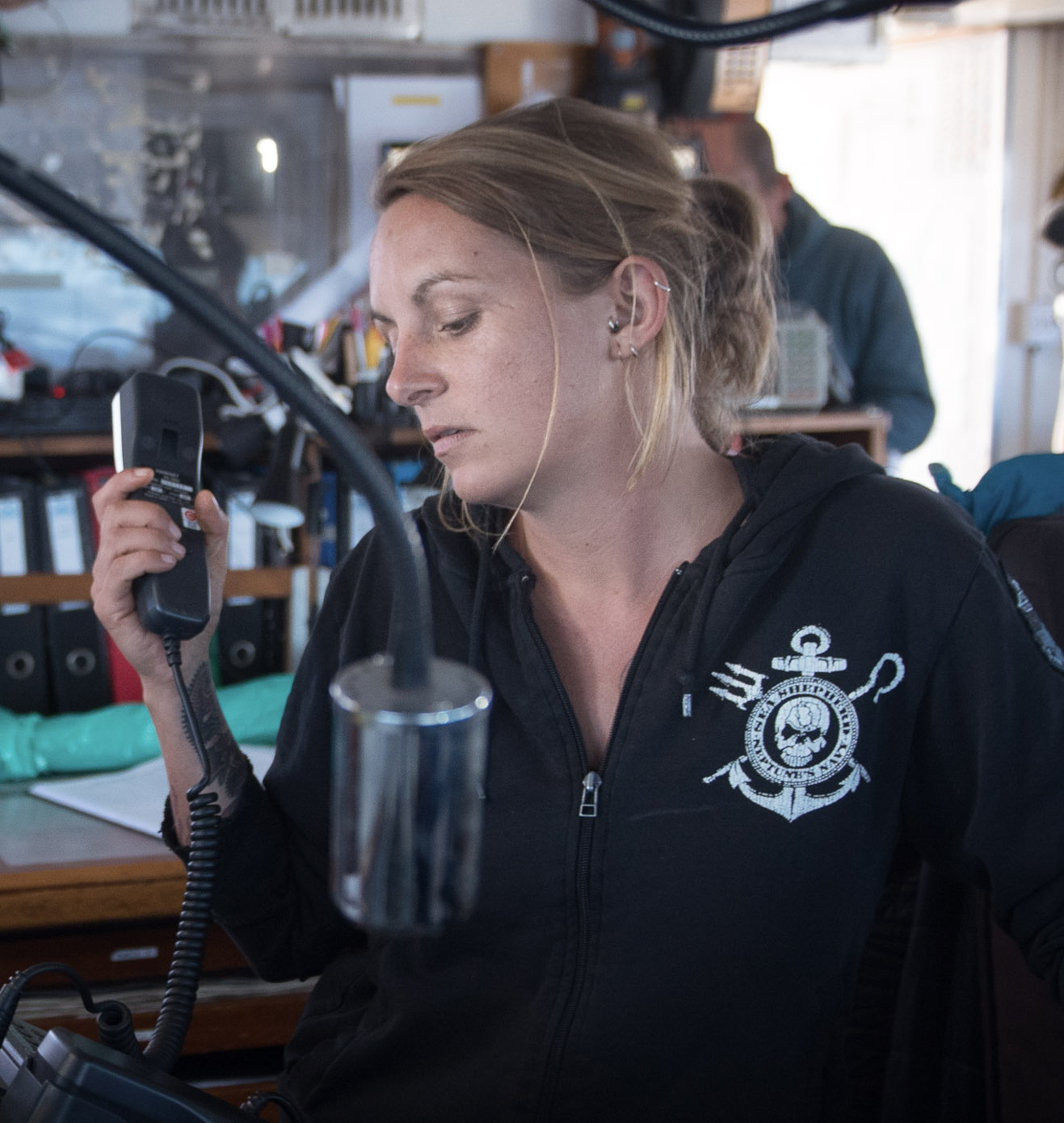
Klemp in 2018

Pia Klemp (born 10 October 1983) is a German biologist and human rights activist, who, between 2011 and 2017, worked for the Sea Shepherd organization to participate in many international operations to protect sea animals.

Between 2016 and 2018 she commanded two rescue ships in the Mediterranean Sea for the German non-government organizations (NGOs) Jugend Rettet and Sea-Watch during the ongoing European migrant crisis. Her ships rescued about 14,000 migrants from drowning. Klemp was responsible for the rescue of more than a thousand migrants. One of her ships, Iuventa, was seized by Italian authorities in 2017, who accused her of cooperating with human traffickers, and claimed many of those saved were at no imminent risk of death. If convicted, she would have faced 20 years in prison. Her newer ship, Sea-Watch 3 was prevented from departing its dock by Maltese authorities for several months in 2018.

== Life and work ==
Klemp was born in 1983 in Bonn-Beuel, Germany. She studied biology in Bonn, but dropped out before finishing. For two years she worked as a diving instructor and participated in several nature conservation projects in Germany, Thailand and Indonesia.

In 2011 she joined the marine conservation organization Sea Shepherd, working aboard MY Steve Irwin, MY Bob Barker, MY Sam Simon and MV Brigitte Bardot, for six years in various positions such as cook, rescue diver, deckhand, ship manager and second mate, while gaining her sea captain's license. During this time she took part in many missions including Operation Relentless and Operation Milagro.

On 9 June 2015, she founded Aquascope e.V., an organization to develop and utilize surveillance technologies to tackle illegal, unreported and unregulated (IUU) fishing.

With the emerging European migrant crisis since 2015, she switched in 2017 to rescue ship operations in the Mediterranean Sea, commanding Iuventa by the German Jugend Rettet organization in two missions until the ship was seized by Italian authorities on 2 August 2017. Presented at Manifesta 12, a Goldsmiths, University of London-based Forensic Oceanography and Forensic Architecture team of researchers came to the conclusion that the crew of Iuventa neither communicated with nor returned empty boats back to the traffickers.

Since early November 2017 she was responsible for the first four rescue missions of Sea-Watch 3 near the Libyan coast, after the ship was taken over by the German Sea-Watch organization from Médecins Sans Frontières Spain. On 1 June 2018, Sea-Watch 3 was blocked from leaving the harbour of Valletta by Maltese authorities until October 2018.

The forthcoming suit in the Iuventa court case forced Klemp to temporarily stop her rescue activities at sea and return to Germany in August 2018. Later that year she founded the group "Solidarity at Sea".

Klemp is author of the novels Allmende und Schrebergarten (English: "Commons and allotment") and Lass uns mit den Toten tanzen (English: "Let us dance with the dead"). She has also written Entlarvung (English: "Exposure"), Wutschrift: Wände einreißen, anstatt sie hochzugehen (English: "Rage-Manuscript: Tearing down walls instead of climbing them") and Les vivants, les morts et les marins (English: "The living, the dead, and the sailors").

According to The Guardian, Klemp accepted the offer of street artist and activist Banksy to command the NGO vessel Louise Michel, which departed for its first mission in late August 2020. In the report, she told The Guardian, "I don't see sea rescue as a humanitarian action, but as part of an anti-fascist fight".

== Media ==
On 13 January 2017, Michael Steinbrecher hosted Klemp and other guests in his Nachtcafé 90-minute talkshow at Südwestrundfunk (SWR) discussing her marine life conservation and anti-whaling activities with Sea Shepherd.

On 10 June 2018, the Biografilm Festival in Bologna, Italy, introduced Michele Cinque's 86-minute cinema documentary Iuventa.

On 7 September 2018, Alfred Schier interviewed Klemp for half an hour in Phoenix persönlich, on Phoenix.

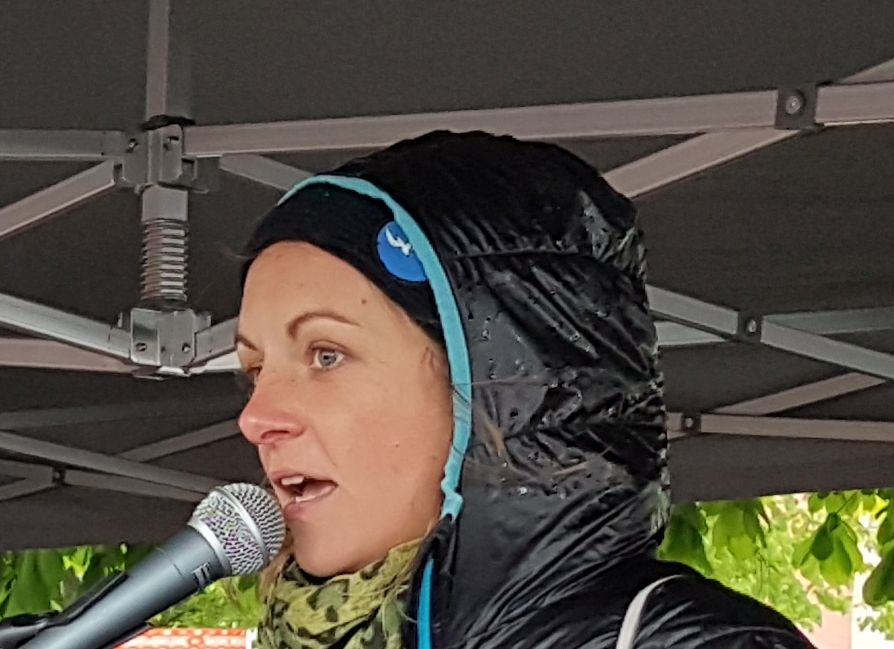
Pia Klemp speaking at a demonstration in Bregenz on 5 May 2019

On 5 March 2019, Katja Kipping spoke about Klemp in a feature Bedeutende Frauen der Weltgeschichte - Pia Klemp (English: "Important women of world history - Pia Klemp") by Julia Menger and Kerstin Hermes in "Der schöne Morgen" of radioeins, Rundfunk Berlin-Brandenburg (RBB).

Also in March 2019 Klemp was interviewed for half an hour for the OstWest format by Moritz Gathmann.

On 4 April 2019, Westdeutscher Rundfunk (WDR) broadcast an 8-minute documentary about Klemp by Iris Toussaint.

On 29 May 2019, Joko & Klaas by Joko Winterscheidt and Klaas Heufer-Umlauf of ProSieben featured her in a 15-minute theatrical-like staging.

On 8 July 2019, Bayerischer Rundfunk (BR) broadcast an 11-minute telephone interview by Knut Cordsen.

== Awards ==
- On 1 March 2019 Klemp was awarded the Clara Zetkin Women's Award (German: Clara-Zetkin-Frauenpreis).
- On 10 May 2019 Klemp and the Iuventa crew were awarded the Swiss Paul Grüninger Award (German: Paul Grüninger Preis).
- The council of the City of Paris on 12 July 2019 announced that the two captains of the Sea-Watch 3, Klemp and Carola Rackete, will receive the Grand Vermeil Medal, the top award of the City of Paris, for saving migrants at sea, because the two captains symbolized "solidarity for the respect of human lives". Klemp declined the award, issuing a statement criticizing the Parisian government for their own actions saying in a statement "Your police is stealing blankets from people that you force to live on the streets, while you raid protests and criminalize people that are standing up for rights of migrants and asylum seekers. You want to give me a medal for actions that you fight in your own ramparts."

== See also ==
- Sea Shepherd Conservation Society operations
- Carola Rackete
