= Martin Günther =

Martin Günther may refer to:

- Martin Günther (athlete)
- Martin Günther (politician)
