= Elmar Schreiber =

German mathematician and physicist

Elmar Schreiber (born February 10, 1952, in Paderborn), is a German professor of mathematics and physics. He was rector of Bremen University of Applied Sciences and founding president of Jade University of Applied Sciences in north-western Lower Saxony with campuses in Wilhelmshaven, Oldenburg and Elsfleth from September 2, 2009. His term as president ended on August 31, 2015. From that point until his retirement in February, 2025, he was a full professor at the Jade University.

== Education ==
After graduating from high school in Paderborn in 1977, Elmar Schreiber began studying physics and mathematics at the University of Paderborn. In 1989, he received his doctorate from the University of Paderborn with a dissertation on Localized electron states and their interaction with excitons in ionic crystals.

== Career ==
From 1985 to the beginning of 1991, Schreiber was a research assistant at the University of Paderborn. He then went to the Freie Universität Berlin as a postdoc, where he completed his habilitation in 1996. He became a project leader at the Max Born Institute for Nonlinear Optics and Short Pulse Spectroscopy, where he worked until the end of 1998. He was then appointed Director of the Center for Ultrafast Laser Applications in the Chemistry Department of Princeton University (USA).

In June 2002, Schreiber became rector of the Bremen University of Applied Sciences. During his tenure as rector, the University completed the conversion of degree courses as part of the Bologna Process, increased the number of accredited degree courses from 38 to 62 restructured into five departments instead of the previous nine faculties, and established a private-sector International Graduate Center with eleven fee-based study programs.

In the 2007 election for rector, Schreiber was defeated by the lawyer Hans-Christoph Jahr, who was however unable to take office due to a concealed criminal record. Schreiber then took over the rectorate on an interim basis, but moved to the Fraunhofer Institute for Digital Medicine MEVIS at the University of Bremen as a consultant in 2008. In September 2009, he became the founding president of Jade University of Applied Sciences, which he headed for six years, and where remained a professor of mathematics and physics in the engineering faculty until his retirement.
