= Carola Rackete =

German ship captain and human-rights activist

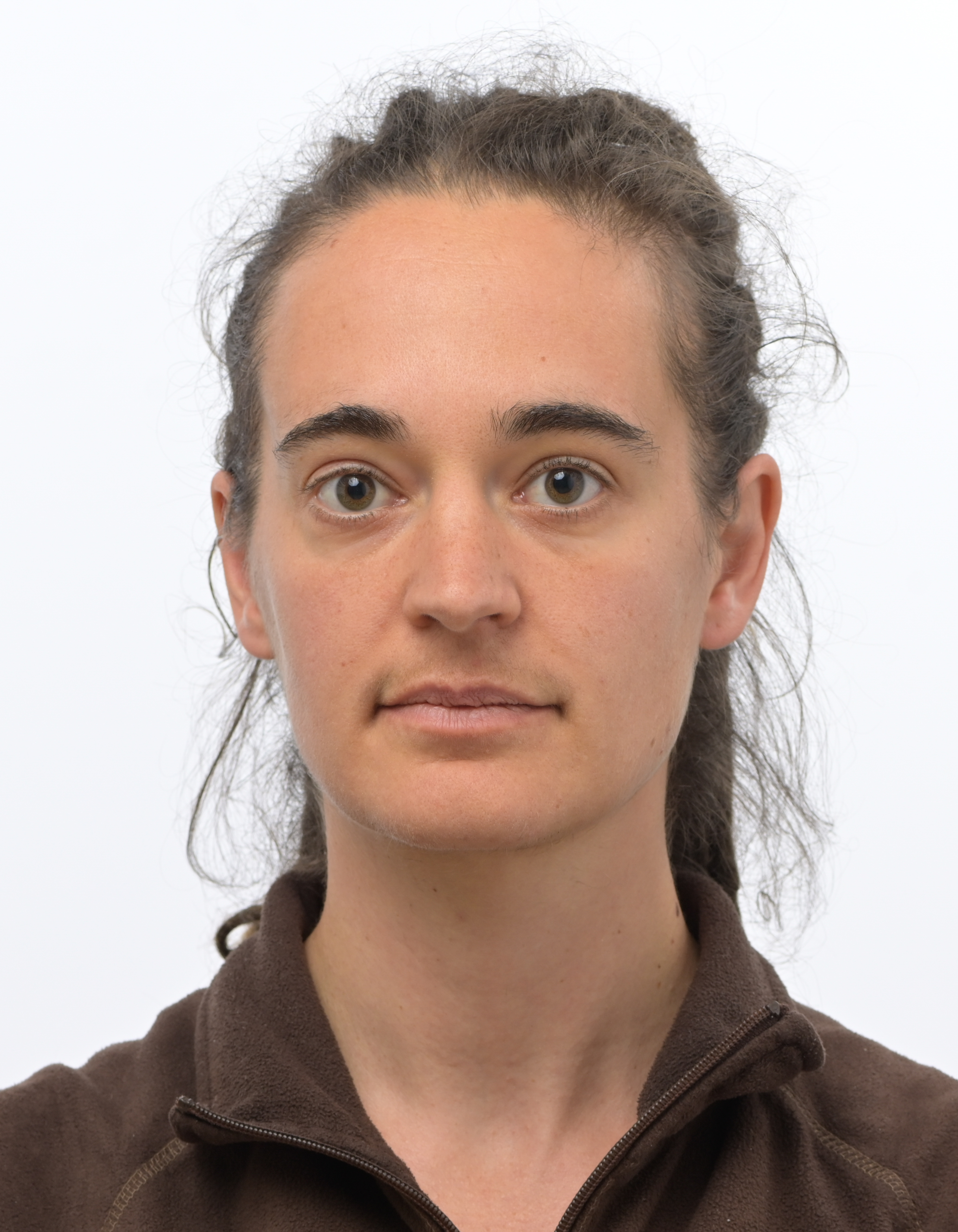
- Official portrait, 2024

Member of the European Parliament for Germany
- In office 16 July 2024 – 9 July 2025
- Succeeded by: Martin Günther

Personal details
- Born: Carola Rackete; 8 May 1988 (age 38) Preetz, West Germany
- Party: Independent close to The Left (since 2023)
- Education: Edge Hill University; Jade University of Applied Sciences
- Occupation: Sea captain; activist; politician
- Awards: Medalla d'Honor del Parlament de Catalunya (2019); Medal of the City of Paris (2019)

Carola Rackete (pronounced [kaˈʁoːla ʁaˈkeːtə]; (Note: Rackete (originally derived from Raquette or Rachetta) is a very rare surname in Germany, consequently there is no universally accepted standard pronunciation. Applying normal German pronunciation rules, the name would have to be pronounced as Rackete (IPA: [ˈʁaketə]), but Carola Rackete's name is instead pronounced identical to the normal German noun Rakete (IPA: [ʁaˈkeːtə]), which is also rare as a surname.) born 8 May 1988) is a German conservation ecologist, activist, politician and former ship captain. She was elected to the European Parliament as an independent candidate for the Left Party on 9 June 2024.

Rackete participated in several research expeditions to Antarctica and the Southern Ocean and is co-founder of the Antarctic Rights initiative. She also supported the Extinction Rebellion movement and took part in forest protests in Sweden, as well as the occupations of the Hambach Forest and the Dannenrod Forest in Germany. Between 2016 and 2019, she occasionally volunteered for non-governmental sea rescue organisations in the Mediterranean. In June 2019, she was arrested for docking a migrant rescue vessel without authorization in the port of Lampedusa, Italy. The custodial judge considered Rackete's actions as justified because she had a duty to save lives at sea and ruled that Rackete should not have been arrested. In 2021, the pending investigation was formally dismissed, since the state prosecutor did not see a reason to proceed to court.

== Early life ==
Rackete was born in Preetz, near Kiel, Germany. She graduated high school in 2007, then studied at Maritime School at Jade University of Applied Sciences in Elsfleth, earning a Bachelor of Science in nautical science and maritime transport in 2011. The B.Sc. in Nautical science at Jade University meets the written examination requirement for the captain's licence of the Federal Maritime and Hydrographic Agency of Germany, which is later acquired on the basis of professional experience only.

In 2018 she earned a master's degree in conservation management from Edge Hill University in England.

== Career ==
Rackete was a navigation officer for two years in scientific expeditions in the Arctic and the Antarctic for the Alfred Wegener Institute for Polar and Marine Research.

She worked as a conservation volunteer for nine months as part of a European Volunteer Service within the Bystrinsky Nature Reserve in the Kamchatka Peninsula in Russia. Later, Carola Rackete worked for 10 weeks as safety officer for Silversea Cruises, a luxury cruise line headquartered in Monaco. She later worked as second-officer and Chief Mate on ships owned by Greenpeace and the British Antarctic Survey.

From 2015 to 2018 she studied Conservation Management at Edge Hill University in Ormskirk, England, graduating with a Masters.

Since completing her degree in conservation management in 2018, Rackete has been working as a conservation ecologist and activist. She supported the environmental movement Extinction Rebellion in its beginning and co-founded Extinction Rebellion Germany in Berlin in 2019. She was involved in the occupations of Hambach Forest and Dannenröder Forest in Germany.

As part of the field research for her master's thesis, Rackete studied the development of the wandering albatross population in South Georgia between 2017 and 2018 and took part in the long-term monitoring of seabirds and vegetation. In spring 2020, Rackete was part of a research cruise to the Antarctic conducted by Greenpeace. In 2023, she worked as a research assistant on a research expedition on fin whales in the West Antarctic conducted by the University of Hamburg on RV Maria S. Merian. Rackete successfully campaigned against the Davis airport project in Antarctica with the Bob Brown Foundation and is committed to the long-term protection of Antarctica and its wildlife. She is a co-founder of the Antarctic Rights initiative and one of the main initiators of the Antarctic Declaration, which calls for Antarctica to be recognised as a legal entity. In 2022, she took part in a protest by the indigenous Sámi population against deforestation in the Arctic and for the land rights of the Sámi.

In her podcast 'Just Nature?', Rackete talks about species extinction and the importance of justice in the global conservation movement.

In November 2021, Racket published the translation of her German environmental justice bestseller, The Time to Act is Now, with the Rosa Luxemburg Stiftung.

== Sea-Watch 3 incident of June 2019 ==
On 12 June, the ship picked up 53 migrants in the Mediterranean off the Libyan coast. Sea-Watch 3 rejected an offer to dock at Tripoli, which is considered unsafe by the European Union and the humanitarian organizations, and headed toward Lampedusa. According to a map they posted, and also to a report by the Süddeutsche Zeitung and other non-governmental organizations (NGOs) this was the nearest safe harbor per maritime law. On 14 June, Italy closed its ports to migrant rescue ships. Italian interior minister Matteo Salvini refused to allow the ship to dock until other European nations had agreed to take the migrants. Ten of the migrants, including children, pregnant women, and those who were ill, were allowed to disembark. On 28 June, Finland, France, Germany, Luxembourg and Portugal offered to take the migrants.

On 29 June, without authorization, Rackete decided to dock. The motivation for this was that, according to her, the passengers were exhausted. Rackete was arrested by the Italian authorities after docking.

Italian interior minister Matteo Salvini accused Rackete of trying to sink an Italian patrol boat that was trying to intercept her and that her ship collided with, calling the incident an act of war and demanding the Netherlands intervene.

Italian Prime Minister Giuseppe Conte "scrambled to address the matter" at the 2019 G20 Osaka summit. Germany protested against the arrest. Crowdfunding appeals in Italy and Germany had raised over €1 million as of 1 July for Sea-Watch legal defence. Fortune called Rackete the "fresh new face" of the European migrant crisis.

Sea-Watch 3 has a mainly German crew but sailed under Dutch flag. In the Netherlands, main government party VVD stated that NGOs that deliberately without permission pick up people should be convicted for facilitating human trafficking. Spokesman Jeroen van Wijngaarden said that: "They are factually not a rescue service but a ferry service." Within the Dutch coalition government, they got support from the CDA, and in the Dutch parliament there basically was a majority that supported this. Nevertheless, the two other parties in the coalition government protested strongly against this statement.

Eventually, Rackete was released from house arrest after a court ruling that she had broken no laws and acted to protect passengers' safety. Rackete's lawyer filed a lawsuit against Salvini for defamation on social media, alleging that he incited his followers to threaten her.

The council of the City of Paris on 12 July 2019 announced that the two captains of Sea-Watch 3, Pia Klemp and Carola Rackete, will receive the Grand Vermeil Medal, the top award of the City of Paris, for saving migrants at sea, because the two captains symbolized "solidarity for the respect of human lives". Both refused the medal, defining this decision "hypocritical". Klempt wrote in a statement: "You want to award me a medal...because our crews 'work' to rescue migrants from difficult conditions on a daily basis. At the same time your police steal blankets from people you force to live on the streets while you suppress protests and criminalise people who defend the rights of migrants and asylum seekers."

As of July 2019, Rackete was under investigation by Italian authorities for possible criminal activities in regards to undocumented migration. If convicted, Rackete would have faced up to 15 years in prison. In January 2020, on appeal the Italian Supreme Court of Cassation ruled that Rackete should never have been arrested.

On 10 September 2019 she was awarded with the Medal of Honor of the Parliament of Catalonia, given by the president of the Catalan Parliament, in recognition for her humanitarian work. In October 2020, Carola Rakete was awarded the first Karl Küpper award. On 6 May 2021, two days before her 33rd birthday, she was awarded a doctor honoris causa from the University of Namur in Belgium.

On 19 May 2021 a court in Agrigento ruled that no trial should be held, agreeing with a state prosecutor that the actions had been undertaken in an effort to save the lives of the migrants.

== Political engagement ==
In July 2023, Rackete and the federal leadership of The Left announced that she would be one of the party's top candidates, despite registering as independent, for the 2024 European elections. The Left is a democratic socialist political party descended from the Marxist-Leninist Socialist Unity Party of Germany. Rackete suggested that the party should consider distancing itself from its past as SED, but apologized for this demand after receiving intense criticism from the party, stating that "the left has come to terms with its past" and sharing a 1989 speech in which the left distanced itself from Stalinism. She said at her presentation that she wanted to give social movements a parliamentary voice, saying that "the climate crisis is the result of capitalist exploitation and it is the biggest crisis of justice in the world". As an independent candidate for the European Parliament, Rackete was committed to climate and social justice, and campaigns for affordable renewable energy for all, a just restructuring of the economy and the preservation and restoration of nature.

Following her election to the European Parliament in June 2024, Rackete served as a member of the Committees on the Environment, Public Health and Food Safety (ENVI), on Economic and Monetary Affairs (ECON) and on Agriculture and Rural Development (AGRI).

On 9 July 2025, The Left announced that Rackete gave up her seat in the European Parliament with immediate effect, with the activist citing the successful renewal of the party and discussions about "shaping [her] mandate collectively" as the main reasons behind her resignation; Martin Günther, from Brandenburg, proceeded to take Rackete's seat.
