= Seebrücke =

European civil society movement

Seebrücke (Create safe havens) is a decentralized, international, civil society movement that was formed in 2018. It is directed against the European policy of isolationism and, in particular, against the criminalization of sea rescue in the Mediterranean. The members show solidarity with all refugees and call on politicians to create safe escape routes.

== Emergence ==
The movement arose spontaneously after the rescue ship Lifeline, with 234 rescued people on board, had been prevented from entering a port for days in June 2018. It was initially advertised via a satirical campaign by the Peng Collective, which claimed that the Federal Ministry of the Interior, Building and Community would accept all people in distress in Germany by 2019. The actor Jan Josef Liefers took part in the video, and the movement was advertised by the entertainer Jan Böhmermann. The band KAFVKA as well as 'Mensch Mensch Mensch e.V.' were significantly involved in the development process of the alliance. Since the 2019/20 season, Seebrücke has been supported by the football club SV Babelsberg 03 who have drawn attention to the movement with print on their Football shirts.

== Advancement ==
The movement calls for safe escape routes across Europe, a humane reception of refugees and a decriminalization of sea rescue. According to the organisers, more than 79,000 people have taken to the streets in over 30 cities in Germany since the beginning of July 2018. 12,000 people took part in the largest demonstrations to date, on July 7, 2018 in Berlin and as many as 16,400 people took part in Hamburg on September 2, 2018, and thousands of people took to the streets in other large cities such as Cologne.

The Seebrücke movement is supported by over two hundred organizations.

== Orange vests ==
As a sign of solidarity with sea rescuers and refugees, orange clothes, scarves and balloons are worn at demonstrations as well as in everyday life, in reference to the colour of life jackets.

Orange life jackets have been attached to numerous churches so that they could be seen from the outside.

== Safe haven ==
Many German cities and municipalities have declared themselves safe havens by means of a city council resolution. According to their own statements, they offer protection and reception to people rescued from distress at sea and actively support sea rescue. However, the federal government must continue to assume the majority of the costs for the refugees admitted and the cities would only incur minimal additional costs.

As of May 2019, 54 cities had joined the movement. By 1 March 2020, 138 cities had joined the movement. As of May 2021, there were 252 such areas.

== Demonstrations ==
Action groups have formed or negotiations are ongoing in the city council, with particularly notable demonstrations in the following cities:

=== Nuremberg ===
On March 30, 2019, around 700 people demonstrated for the city of Nuremberg to pledge to be a "safe haven".

=== Berlin ===
On March 30, 2019, several thousand people demonstrated for the city of Berlin to pledge to be a "safe haven".
