= Jade University of Applied Sciences =

Public university in Lower Saxony, Germany

Coordinates: 53.548°N 8.088°E

- Jade Hochschule
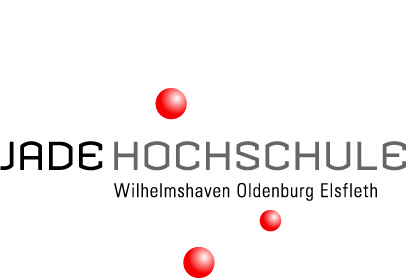
- Type: Public university
- Established: 2009
- President: Manfred Weisensee
- Students: 7,000
- Location: Wilhelmshaven, Oldenburg, Elsfleth
- Campus: Multiple campuses
- Address: Friedrich-Paffrath-Straße 101, 26389 Wilhelmshaven
- Website: https://www.jade-hs.de/

The Jade University of Applied Sciences (German: Jade Hochschule) is a public university in Lower Saxony, Germany. It was founded in 2009 as a successor to the Fachhochschule Oldenburg/Ostfriesland/Wilhelmshaven. Its founding president was Elmar Schreiber. The university has campuses in Wilhelmshaven, Oldenburg and Elsfleth and around 6,700 students.

The university is named after the Jade river.

== Notable alumni ==
- Matthias Groote, politician, member of the European Parliament.
- Carola Rackete, captain and activist.
- Olaf Lies, politician, multiple times Minister of Lower Saxony.
