= European Center for Constitutional and Human Rights =

Non-profit human rights organization

European Center for Constitutional and Human Rights (ECCHR)
- Formation: 5 March 2007
- Founder: Wolfgang Kaleck
- Purpose: Human rights organization
- Location: Berlin
- Board of directors: Lotte Leicht, Tobias Singelnstein, Dieter Hummel
- Website: https://www.ecchr.eu/en/

The European Center for Constitutional and Human Rights (ECCHR) is an independent, non-profit non-governmental organization with the aim of enforcing human rights through legal means. Using litigation, it tries to hold state and non-state actors responsible for human rights violations. It was founded in 2007 by the German civil rights attorney Wolfgang Kaleck, together with a group of human rights lawyers, in order to help protect the rights guaranteed by the Universal Declaration of Human Rights, as well as other declarations of human rights and national constitutions, by juridical means. ECCHR engages in litigation, using European, international, and national law to help protect human rights.

The ECCHR offices are located in a large former soap factory in Berlin, along with Forensic Architecture and other investigative agencies and human rights organizations.

The ECCHR gained public attention in 2017, when it filed a criminal complaint to the German Attorney General against CIA Deputy Director Gina Haspel for her alleged involvement in torture. In 2021, it filed a legal case against five Chechen officials for crimes against humanity.

== Topics and focus ==
ECCHR initiates, develops, and supports strategic human rights litigation to hold state and non-state actors accountable for human rights violations. In doing so, ECCHR tries to work on cases that illustrate and highlight legal and social problems, recognizing that human rights violations are committed in specific contexts with a view to achieving certain financial, social, military or political goals. ECCHR often influences debates about these issues from a power-critical perspective.

ECCHR litigates cases but also researches, investigates, and helps to coordinate the development strategies of legal advocacy around cases. The organization conducts work within a network of partner organizations, lawyers and those affected by concrete human rights violations.

ECCHR's work focuses on cases in the following areas:

=== International Crimes and Accountability ===
The International Crimes and Accountability Program aims to ensure that grave breaches of international law, such as war crimes, torture and other crimes against humanity, are prosecuted and the perpetrators brought to justice. ECCHR is focusing its work on the following countries and themes:

- War crimes and crimes against humanity perpetrated for example in Syria, Sri Lanka, Colombia, and Argentina
- Grave human rights violations committed in the course of countering terrorism by the USA, the UK, and their allies in Guantánamo, Iraq, and Afghanistan, as well as through drone strikes
- Grave human rights violations, including torture and sexual violence, in Yemen, Colombia, Syria, and Congo
- Dealing with the crimes of the dictatorships in Argentina and Chile (Colonia Dignidad)
- NATO and UN responsibility in Serbia and Afghanistan

=== Migration ===
ECCHR's Migration program advocates for the fundamental protection and rights of refugees and challenges asylum policies in Europe through strategic case work. Areas of focus include:

- EU's asylum, refugee and migration policies
- Unlawful push-backs at the EU's external borders

=== Business and Human Rights ===
The Business and Human Rights program looks at three main areas: transnational corporate activities in authoritarian regimes and conflict zones, working conditions in the global supply chain and business activities that affect economic and social rights. Areas of focus include:

- Cooperation of companies with regimes and conflict parties and their relation to human rights violations (e.g. in Syria, Yemen, Colombia, Argentina)
- Inhumane working conditions in the global supply chain in agro and textile industries (e. g. in Pakistan, China, Bangladesh, Qatar)
- Access to land and livelihoods (e. g. in Zimbabwe, Peru)

=== Institute for Legal Intervention ===
In the Institute for Legal Intervention, ECCHR focuses on critical perspectives on law, particularly concerning dynamics of power. By combining legal theory and practice and through exchange with research institutions and universities, but also through collaboration with activists, artists and partners worldwide, ECCHR aims to contribute to political, legal and societal debates regarding unjust power relations and social justice. At the core of this work lies the understanding of law as an expression of societal power relations and thus an instrument of hegemony, but also the recognition of the emancipatory potential of law.

An important part of ECCHR's work is the Critical Legal Training, in which ECCHR regularly trains and educates human rights activists.

=== Critical Legal Training ===
ECCHR's Critical Legal Training offers participants a platform for the theory and practice of international human rights law. It aims to develop and further a critical analysis of contemporary issues of law and society. ECCHR claims that since 2008 about 400 human rights lawyers from more than 40 countries have been volunteers or trainees at the organization.

== Public Relations and Advocacy ==
ECCHR organizes conferences and other public events, conducts media outreach, and publishes web-based and print reports and communications to inform the public about grave human rights violations worldwide.

== Lawsuits ==
In 2025 the activists partnered with Pakistani NGO's HANDS Welfare Foundation and National Trade Union Federation (NTUF) to sue the German companies RWE and Heidelberg Materials for damages which occurred in the 2022 Pakistan floods with local farms, citing the responsibility of both companies for Climate change.

In 2025 the ECCHR activists filed a lawsuit with the German Federal Constitutional Court for a Palestinian man, which aimed to forbid Germany from exporting Renk gearboxes for tanks to Israel. The plaintiff had lost family members due to Israeli military actions and stated that Germany had the duty to protect his right to life and should not allow the delivery. In early 2026 the court declared itself not competent to hear the case and explained that while International humanitarian law must be considered when greenlighting arms exports, there is no legally enforceable right to specific measures.
