= 303 (film) =

2018 German film

- Directed by: Hans Weingartner
- Starring: Mala Emde; Anton Spieker
- Release date: 16 February 2018 (BIFF)
- Running time: 148 minutes
- Country: Germany
- Language: German

303 is a 2018 German romantic road movie directed by Hans Weingartner. The film stars Mala Emde and Anton Spieker as strangers who journey across Europe in a Mercedes 303 camper van, leading to deep conversations and an evolving connection. The film was praised for its authentic dialogue, emotional depth, and naturalistic performances.

303 premiered on February 16, 2018, at the Berlin International Film Festival, where it opened the Generation section. It was released in Germany on July 19, 2018, and in Austria the following day. The film made its first broadcast on Bayerischer Rundfunk on August 19, 2021, as part of the night program, although it was shown in a version shortened by about 20 minutes. It received a positive reception from both audiences and critics.

== Plot ==
Jule, a 24-year-old biology student, fails her final exam just before the summer semester ends. On top of that, she discovers she is unintentionally pregnant. Her mother pressures her to have an abortion, but Jule is unsure. Hoping to involve the father, Alex, who is writing his doctoral thesis in Portugal, she decides to drive her late brother's Mercedes Hymer 303 camper van to find him. Her brother had died by suicide, making the journey even more emotionally charged for Jule.

Shortly after leaving Berlin, Jule picks up Jan, a politics student about her age, who is hitchhiking to Cologne and plans to continue to northern Spain to meet his biological father. The two quickly engage in deep discussions, and when the sensitive topic of suicide arises, Jule reacts emotionally and drops Jan off at the next stop. Later, at a motorway service station, a man approaches Jule, claiming to be interested in her camper van, but his intentions turn sexual. By coincidence, Jan is at the station as well, having been picked up by a trucker. When he realizes he left his phone in Jule's van, he arrives just in time to help her fend off the attacker. Afterward, Jule, feeling more at ease, invites Jan to stay the night in her van.

The next morning, Jule invites Jan to continue traveling with her. They argue again this time about whether people are naturally inclined toward competition (as Jan believes) or cooperation (as Jule thinks). As they travel through Belgium and into France, they slow down, enjoying the scenic countryside, quiet rest stops, and shared meals. Their conversations deepen, becoming more personal and exploring topics such as the relationship between men and women and what makes it work. Despite these discussions, Jule still struggles with her pregnancy. When she tells Alex over the phone, his distant response leaves her feeling disappointed. Jan tries to comfort her with a Tarte aux Pommes and a gentle, though tentative, touch. It becomes clear that Jule and Jan are beginning to fall in love.

Before they confess their feelings, they reach Jan’s destination. Jule is with him as he sees his father from a distance but is unable to approach him, so they continue their journey together. After some adventures by the Atlantic Ocean including Jan’s first surfboard ride and a chilly hike Jule and Jan finally give in to their feelings. The next morning, Jule confesses that she is pregnant and has decided to carry the child to term. Jan is calm and accepting of her decision.

However, when Jule arrives in Porto, she experiences a miscarriage. She consults a gynecologist and learns that she has lost the embryo. Despite the heartbreak, Jule continues her journey, dropping Jan off in the town center before heading to Alex. Jan waits for her, falling asleep in a café and then on the steps of the market square. Late at night, Jule returns to her camper van. They both run toward each other, unsure of what the future holds, but knowing they’ve both been changed by their journey.

== Cast ==
- Mala Emde - Jule
- Anton Spieker - Jan
- Arndt Schwering-Sohnrey as Typ
- Thomas Schmuckert as Jules Prüfer
- Martin Feifel as Jan’s biological father
- Jörg Bundschuh as Jans Professor
- Hannah Schröder as Mother
- Valeria Dymova as Gas station girl
- Caroline Erikson

== Production ==
Development

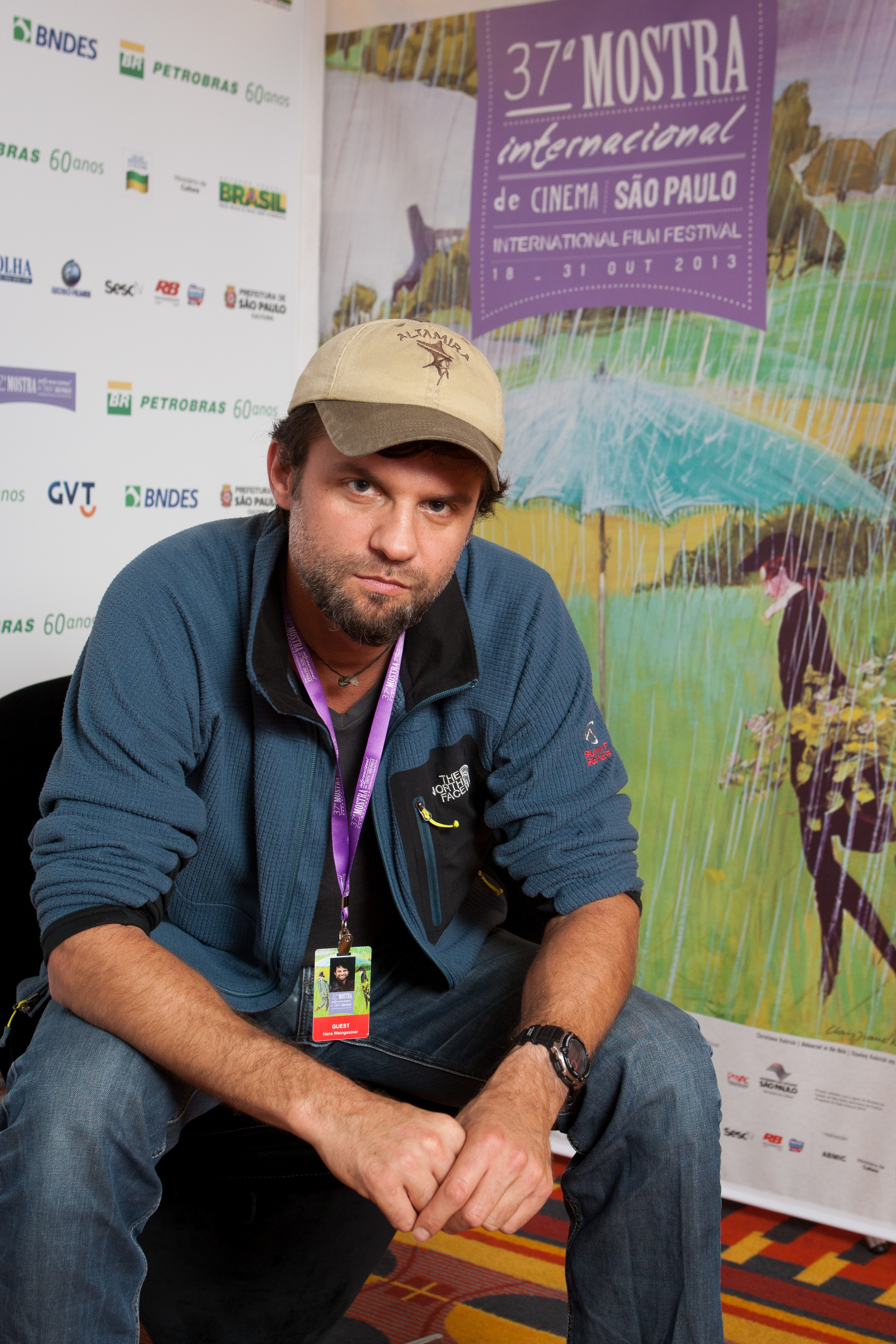
film was written and directed by Hans Weingartner

The idea for 303 emerged during the shooting of Hans Weingartner's first film, The white noise. While on tour in an old Mercedes bus, similar to the one in 303, Weingartner found himself in a suspended reality, much like a "time machine," driven by a hippie woman. During their journey, they engaged in hours of conversation about life and everything in between, and in later years, he found a sense of euphoria in the phase of getting to know a woman. Inspired by this experience, he wanted to create a film that echoed the spirit of Before Sunrise, but with a more personal and emotional touch, without the ironic distance that defined Richard Linklater's film.

Weingartner aimed to break away from the typical narrative structure of romantic films, where couples are separated early on and then fight to reunite, a dynamic he felt focused more on drama than love. Instead, he sought to capture the subtle phase of falling in love and the gradual process of emotional closeness. He described 303 as a "friendship film about two souls who meet and get to know each other." Weingartner also wanted to move beyond his previous film, The Eden of Eden, where the protagonists sought a relatively simple "solution" (eliminating the "bigwigs"). In contrast, 303 explores more fundamental questions about what is "really wrong" and how things might be done differently.

In response to suggestions that the dialogues were improvised, Weingartner emphasized that there was nothing random about them. However, achieving a natural sound was one of the greatest challenges of his career. The extensive dialogues posed a major obstacle in securing financing, delaying the film's production.

Finding actors capable of handling the 303-page script was another challenge. Once Mala Emde and Anton Spieker were cast, Weingartner allowed them plenty of rehearsal time to fully absorb the script. This was crucial not only for the actors' performance but also for the practical demands of a road movie, which required careful planning to ensure the film could move efficiently between locations.

Filming

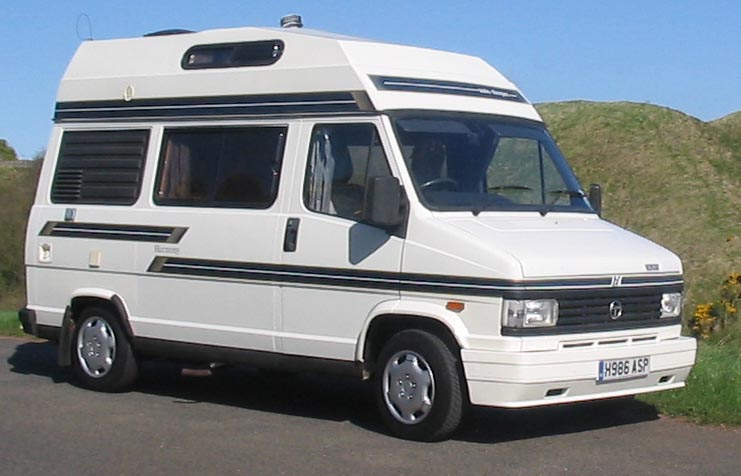

Principal photography for 303 originally began in 2013 but was completed over two years, from August 10 to October 12, 2015. The film was shot in various European locations, including Berlin, Brandenburg, France, Spain, and Portugal, to authentically capture the journey's progression. The use of the Mercedes 303 camper van added an intimate and nostalgic element to the narrative.

Weingartner emphasized a naturalistic approach to the screenplay, allowing the actors to improvise parts of the dialogue to enhance authenticity. The scenic cinematography, capturing lush countryside and urban settings, plays a significant role in conveying the emotional arc of the characters.

== Release and Reception ==
Initially, Weingartner had submitted 303 for the main competition for the Golden Bear at the 2018 Berlinale. However, after discussions with festival director Dieter Kosslick and section head Maryanne Redpath, he agreed to have the film open the "Generation 14plus" section. He expressed satisfaction with the decision, noting, "In 303, it's all about the fact that competition destroys you, and the competition at the Berlinale is extremely tough."

303 premiered at the 2018 Munich Film Festival, where it received a warm reception from audiences and critics alike. The film was praised for its intelligent screenplay, compelling performances, and heartfelt storytelling.

Critical response

Ştefan Dobroiu of Cineuropa praises 303 for its engaging exploration of philosophical themes and emotional depth. He highlights the strong chemistry between Mala Emde and Anton Spieker, whose characters debate topics like capitalism, relationships, and life's meaning while traveling across Europe. The review emphasizes the film's subtle character development and its impactful romantic conclusion. According to The Couch Review, Hans Weingartner's 303 offers a thoughtful and engaging take on the road trip genre, featuring meaningful dialogues and music that complements the story. The film’s slow pace and small cast allow for deep emotional exploration, with the performances of Mala Emde and Anton Spieker driving the narrative. The Couch Review gave the film a rating of 7 out of 10, making it a solid choice for fans of reflective, scenic road trip cinema.

Kirsten Taylor wrote in Der Tagesspiegel that Hans Weingartner’s 303 marks a return to his roots after Free Rainer - Your TV Is Lying. Like previous characters who challenged capitalist society, Jule and Jan reflect critical thinking, though their actions are less radical. Taylor compared them to the lovers in The Eden Years Are Over, noting that, instead of rushing through life, they slowly discover each other. The film invites the audience to yearn for a more thoughtful, introspective journey, like Jule and Jan’s.

The online platform Film plus Kritik was more critical of 303, noting that the film’s running time was too long, and the second half felt uneventful. The first half was praised for its engaging conversations and quick pace, but once it became clear that Jule and Jan would likely become a couple, the film lingered excessively on their "physical rapprochement phase," slowing down the narrative. This shift in focus detracted from the film’s earlier energy. Christian Buß of Spiegel Online praised 303 as "the film of the week and the summer film of the year." He compared it to Richard Linklater’s Before series, noting that 303’s naturalistic dialogue feels less controlled. Buß commended the performances of Anton Spieker and Mala Emde for capturing the complexities of love’s early stages. He concluded that the film, stretching over 145 minutes, creates a sense of anticipation, making viewers eagerly await the characters' first kiss. Claudia Palma, writing for Märkische Allgemeine, described 303 as a wonderful "anti-Tinder film," highlighting its portrayal of a slow, genuine connection between two people rather than quick, superficial interactions. She praised the naturalistic dialogue, which feels so authentic it’s hard to believe it was scripted, and noted how the audience is captivated by the characters' attempt to resist falling in love throughout the film.

== Accolades ==
The film garnered several awards and nominations, including:

- 2018: Generation 14plus - Best Film at the Berlin International Film Festival (nomination)
- 2018: Best Film at the Miami Film Festival (nomination)
- 2018: Best Feature Film at the Valladolid International Film Festival (nomination)
- 2018: Mecklenburg-Vorpommern Film Festival – Young Actor Awards for Mala Emde and Anton Spieker.
- 2018: Five Lakes Film Festival – DACHS Screenplay Award.
- 2018: German Film Music Award – Best Song in a Film : Michael Regner for Magnet Balls (nomination).
