= And Tomorrow the Entire World =

2020 film

- Film poster
- Original title: Und morgen die ganze Welt
- Directed by: Julia von Heinz
- Screenplay by: Julia von Heinz; John Quester
- Produced by: Fabian Gasmia; Julia von Heinz
- Starring: Mala Emde; Noah Saavedra; Tonio Schneider; Luisa-Céline Gaffron; Andreas Lust
- Cinematography: Daniela Knapp
- Edited by: Georg Söring
- Music by: Neonschwarz; Matthias Petsche; Rüdiger Eisberg
- Production companies: Seven Elephant; SWR; WDR; BR; Arte; Haïku Films; Kings & Queens Filmproduktion
- Release dates: 9 September 2020 (Venice); 29 October 2020 (Germany)
- Running time: 111 minutes
- Countries: Germany; France
- Language: German

And Tomorrow the Entire World (German: Und morgen die ganze Welt) is a 2020 German-French political drama film directed by Julia von Heinz. It premiered in competition at the 77th Venice International Film Festival. It was selected as the German entry for the Best International Feature Film at the 93rd Academy Awards, but it was not nominated. The title of the film is taken from the line "Today Germany belongs to us, and tomorrow the whole world" from the National Socialist propaganda song "The Rotten Bones Tremble".

== Plot ==
Luisa, a 20-year-old law student from an upper-class family, moves in to a collective housing squat and becomes an anti-fascist activist because she is opposed to the rise of the neo-Nazi political right in Germany.

The plot is partly inspired by the biography of director Julia von Heinz, who engaged in anti-fascism herself when she was younger. The political design of the movie's right-wing "Liste 14" party is also a reference to that of the group Alternative for Germany.

== Cast ==
- Mala Emde as Luisa
- Noah Saavedra as Alfa
- Tonio Schneider as Lenor
- Luisa-Céline Gaffron as Batte
- Andreas Lust as Dietmar

== Production ==
The film was produced by the motion picture companies Seven Elephants, Kings & Queens Filmproduktion, and Haïku Films on behalf of the public broadcasting channels Südwestrundfunk, Westdeutscher Rundfunk, Bayerischer Rundfunk, and Arte. It received financial support by the FilmFernsehFonds Bayern, the Medienboard Berlin-Brandenburg, the Centre national du cinéma et de l'image animée, the Minitraité, the Medien- und Filmgesellschaft Baden-Württemberg, the Deutscher Filmförderfonds, and the Filmförderungsanstalt. The support of the Filmförderungsanstalt accounted for 310,000 Euro.

== See also ==
- List of submissions to the 93rd Academy Awards for Best International Feature Film
- List of German submissions for the Academy Award for Best International Feature Film
