= Jugend Rettet =

Non-governmental organization from Berlin

Jugend Rettet is a non-governmental organization (NGO) from Berlin. Its goal is to save drowning persons at the Mediterranean Sea. From 2016 to 2017, the organization operated the Dutch-flagged rescue ship Iuventa, which according to the organization rescued around 23,000 people. The ship was seized by Italian authorities in August 2017. The ensuing criminal proceedings against former crew members on suspicion of aiding illegal immigration ended in April 2024 with the case being dismissed, and the ship was returned in July 2024.

The organization is divided into three divisions. First there is the Iuventa crew, with the straplines "Solidarity at Sea" and "Solidarity is not a Crime". The name Iuventa originates from the Roman god of youth and courage. Second, there is a department to encourage political awareness of certain issues. Third, there is a discussion platform for the right of asylum.

During a session of the Italian parliament on 10 May 2017, a prosecutor accused Jugend Rettet of working together with migrant smugglers. Jugend Rettet denied the allegations. Frontex criticized the behaviour of search-and-rescue NGOs operating near Libyan waters, alleging a lack of cooperation with official authorities.

Researchers at Goldsmiths, University of London disputed Frontex's characterisation of NGO rescue vessels as a "pull factor," concluding that the NGO fleet had responded to changes in smuggling practices triggered by anti-smuggling operations, and that no evidence of criminal collaboration with smugglers had been found.

In August 2017, Jugend Rettet, like other organisations such as Sea-Watch or Médecins Sans Frontières, refused to sign the code of conduct for NGOs set up by the Italian government, stating that it was in contradiction with international maritime law.

== Ships ==
The Iuventa is a 32.92-meter former fishing vessel built in 1962 at the shipyard Scheepswerf Vooruit in Zaandam. Originally named Maria, and renamed Waterman II in 1969 and Jonas in 1971, the ship was initially used for fishing. In 1990, she was sold and converted into an offshore support ship, now named Telco Suez. She was resold in late 2001 and renamed Alk Explorer. In 2016, the ship became the property of the Jugend Rettet group, and was rebuilt for rescuing purposes under the new name Iuventa. In 2016 and 2017 she operated in the Mediterranean Sea, mainly assisting shipwrecked refugees and economic migrants.

On 10 June 2018, the Biografilm Festival in Bologna, Italy, introduced Michele Cinque's 86-minute cinema documentary Iuventa about the ship and its missions, filmed between 2016 and 2017. On 10 May 2019 the crew of the Iuventa was honored by the Swiss Paul Grüninger Foundation with a human rights award for saving the lives of around 14000 people in the central Mediterranean Sea.

=== Seizing of the Iuventa ===
On 2 August 2017 the public prosecutor of the Italian municipality of Trapani seized the Iuventa on allegation of cooperation with migrant smugglers and the encouraging of illegal immigration. The confiscation was preceded by a year of investigations by the Italian police. The prosecutor produced witness reports, photo material, video material and sound recordings which should prove that the organization had not tried to rescue people, but taken onboard illegal immigrants during calm sea conditions. The unimpaired vessels of the migrant smugglers subsequently would cruise back. However, presenting at the Manifesta 12 in Palermo, Italy, a Goldsmiths, University of London-based Forensic Oceanography and Forensic Architecture team of researchers stated that the crew of the Iuventa would neither have communicated with nor would have returned empty boats back to the traffickers.

Jugend Rettet disputed the seizing, but on 23 April 2018 the supreme court of Italy confirmed the decision of the court in Trapani that the vessel stays seized awaiting further investigations. In July 2018, investigations were started against some members of Jugend Rettet, including the ship's captain, Pia Klemp. They are accused of aiding illegal immigration and could face up to 20 years in prison.

On April 19, 2024, the entire crew of Iuventa was acquitted of all charges, following an unexpected request for this in February from the prosecutors.

In July 2026, Netflix released a movie, 23.000 lives, based on the story of Jugend Rettet and the Iuventa.

== See also ==
- Hellenic Rescue Team
- Mediterranea Saving Humans
- Migrant Offshore Aid Station
- No Border network
- Proactiva Open Arms
- Sea-Watch
- SOS Méditerranée
