= Luisa-Céline Gaffron =

German actress

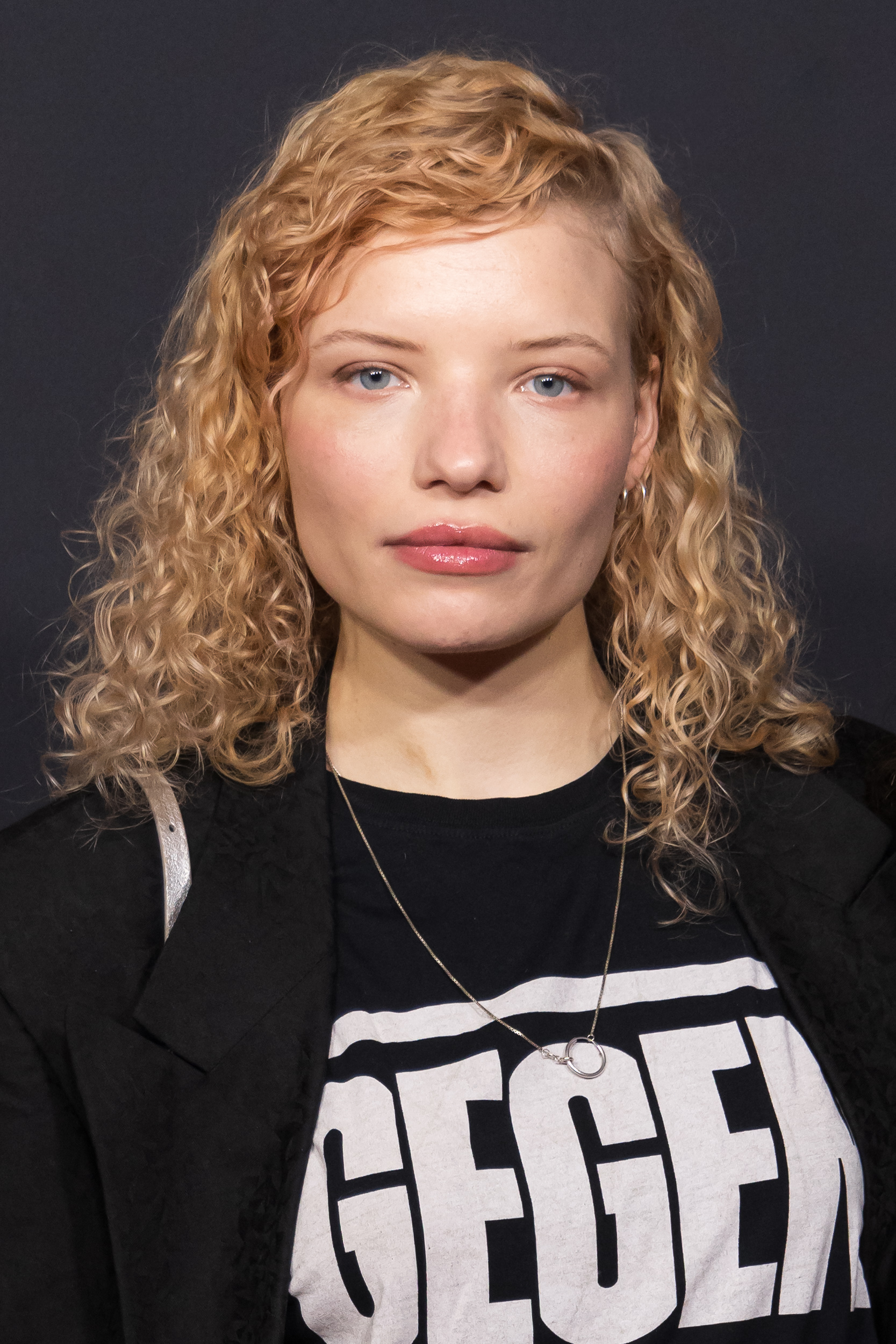
Luisa-Céline Gaffron, 2024

Luisa-Céline Gaffron (born June 6, 1993) is a German and Austrian actress.

== Life and career ==
Luisa-Céline Gaffron grew up in Vienna, where she gained early stage experience. Starting in 2013, she appeared in short films and music videos before moving to Berlin in 2014 to study acting at the University of the Arts. During her studies, she performed at major theaters in Berlin and Potsdam. From 2016 onward, she took on film roles, including Looping and Six Minutes to Midnight alongside Jella Haase and Judi Dench. In 2019, she gained wider recognition with appearances in Tatort, the mini-series 8 Days, and the film Stillstehen. She received several nominations for her performances, including the German Acting Award and the New Faces Award. In 2020, she starred in And Tomorrow the Entire World, appeared at the Salzburg Festival, and took on further TV roles. In 2021, she was featured in the film 3½ Hours, which premiered at the Munich Film Festival.

== Political activism ==
In early January 2023, she and Jonathan Berlin initiated a petition expressing solidarity with the climate protesters in Lützerath. Around 200 prominent individuals joined as initial signatories.

== Filmography ==
Year	Title	Role / Involvement	Type
2013	Beyond	Actress	Music video
2015	Barfuß durch die Scherben	Actress	Music video
2016	Looping	Sara	Feature film
2016	Ianus	Lynn	Short film
2017	Jenny	Jenny (title role)	Short film
2017	Abgestempelt – Der Widerstand	Krätze	TV series
2017	SOKO Leipzig – Vaterliebe	Mira	TV episode
2018	Down Down Down	Lucy	Short film
2018	Tatverdacht: Hilferuf	Caroline Eifel	TV crime episode
2019	8 Tage	Nora Frankenberg	TV series
2019	Stillstehen	Agnes	Feature film
2019	SOKO Potsdam – Fluch der guten Tat	Jennifer Sareike	TV episode
2019	Als Hitler das rosa Kaninchen stahl	Grete Hader	Feature film
2019	Tatort: Für immer und dich	Jona	TV crime series
2020	Tatort: Monster	Evelyn Kohnai	TV crime series
2020	Ostfriesengrab	Christina Diebold	TV crime film
2020	Persischstunden	Jana	Feature film
2020	Aus dem Tagebuch eines Uber-Fahrers – Bist du Ben?	Emma	TV episode
2020	Und morgen die ganze Welt	Batte	Feature film
2020	Polizeiruf 110: Tod einer Toten	Pia Sommer	TV crime series
2021	Six Minutes to Midnight	Siigrid	Feature film
2021	Nord bei Nordwest – Conny & Maik	Conny	TV crime film
2021	Nebenan	Luisa	Feature film
2021	3½ Stunden	Edith Salzmann	TV film
2021	Lieber Thomas	Gerit	Feature film
2021	Ivie wie Ivie	Emma	Feature film
2021	Das Mädchen mit den goldenen Händen	Jenni	Feature film
2021	Mein Sohn	Nurse	Feature film
2021	Schachnovelle	Fridl	Feature film
2022–2024	Der Palast	Nadja Brucker	TV series
2022	Der Irland-Krimi: Familienbande	Abbie Campbell	TV crime film
2023	Wann wird es endlich wieder so, wie es nie war	Waiter	Feature film
2023	Der Schatten	Theresa	TV series
2023	Die Heiland – Kaltblüter	Kiki Becker	TV episode
2024	In aller Freundschaft – Die jungen Ärzte: Durchkreuzt	Lena Wegner	TV episode
2024	SOKO Wismar – Karoline Undercover 1 & 2	Guest role	TV episodes
2025	How to Be Normal and the Oddness of the Other World	Pia	Feature film

== Awards and nominations ==
Year	Award	Category	Project	Result	Shared With / Notes
2020	Chicago International Film Festival	Silver Hugo – Best Ensemble	And Tomorrow the Entire World (Und morgen die ganze Welt)	Won	Shared with Mala Emde, Noah Saavedra, Tonio Schneider, Andreas Lust
2020	New Faces Awards, Germany	Best Actress	Tatort: Monster	Nominated	–
2019	German Screen Actors Awards (DSP)	Best Young Actor	8 Days (8 Tage)	Nominated	–
