= El Hiblu 3 =

Rescued from a ship off the Libyan coast in 2015

The El Hiblu 3 are three migrants who were rescued off the coast of Libya in March 2019. They translated for 100 migrants to prevent an illegal pushback to Libya and instead be brought to Malta on the El Hiblu 1, an oil tanker registered in Turkey and built in 2015. The El Hiblu 3 have been charged with terrorism by Maltese authorities, and the incident has received considerable international media coverage and criticism.

== Background ==
The El Hiblu 3 are Abdalla, Kader, and Amara. Their ages were 19, 16, and 15 respectively at the time of their migration. The El Hiblu 1 was being captained by Nadar El-Hiblu, a Libyan man. Abdalla and Amara were originally from Guinea, and Kader was from Ivory Coast.

Amara had left his home aged 13 due to a family feud, and travelled through the Algerian desert to find unpaid work in Libya. His boss offered to help him travel to Europe. Abdalla migrated together with his wife. He had quit a sociology degree in order to provide for his family, and left for Europe after his father died.

Amara had attended an English-speaking school in Guinea. As the only individual who spoke English in a group of over 100 migrants, he acted as a translator between the migrants and the ship's captain.

== Migration ==
On 27 March 2019, a deflating and sinking dinghy with migrants was spotted off the coast of Libya by a patrol aircraft of the Mission Eunavfor Med. The ship El Hiblu 1 was told to rescue the over 100 migrants on board. The aircraft relayed the instruction of the Libyan Coast Guard to the El Hiblu 1 to go to the Libyan coast. Bringing migrants back to Libya is against the principle of Non-Refoulement because there is proof of human rights violations in the Libyan camps. There was protest among the migrants who feared severe violence in Libya. Abdalla and Abdul tried to calm the other migrants down.

The El Hiblu 3 agreed to speak with the captain, Nadar El-Hiblu, inside his cabin. They explained the concerns of the other migrants, and negotiated transportation to Europe. According to Lamin, "[the captain] said he didn't have enough fuel to get to Italy, but he would take us to Malta instead". A press briefing from the Office of the United Nations High Commissioner for Human Rights stated: "[...]the circumstances around the captain’s decision to finally steer the ship to Malta are disputed[...]". As the ship was approaching Maltese waters, the captain was able to inform the Maltese government he was not in control of his vessel, and that "through coercive action" a group of men had hijacked the ship. El Hiblu 1 was later intercepted by the Special Operations Unit of Armed Forces of Malta, which regained control of the ship and detained 5 of the alleged hijackers before escorting El Hiblu 1 to Valletta, Malta.

After numerous denials, the El Hiblu 3 were granted bail in November 2019 after more than 7 months in prison. They have to attend monthly hearings in the Courts of Valletta since 2019. In November 2023 the Attorney General issued a Bill of Indictment against the three young men with nine charges.

== Controversy ==
The Office of the United Nations High Commissioner for Human Rights stated that the charges of the three teenagers were exaggerated, criticized their legal treatment (two of the three were minors) and said the charges had to be reconsidered. Amnesty International urges Malta to drop all charges against the teenagers.

The Catholic Church has criticized the case, and the Archbishop of Malta has called for the charges to be dropped. Representing the archbishop, Reverend Anton D'Amato has said: "We believe this is a case of injustice, that these charges are an exaggeration. We can't understand why three teenagers, who were trying to escape somewhere terrible, and who were acting as interpreters, could be accused of terrorism. Migration is not a crime and we hope they are freed as soon as possible."

Evarist Bartolo, the foreign minister of Malta, has expressed frustration with what he perceives as the countries of the European Union abandoning Malta to deal with migration alone: "Can you try to empathise with such a small state trying to cope with this? I think it's unfair to focus on a case which deals with three people - and paint Malta as a rogue, insensitive state and we don't care about these people. We've done our bit, we have saved thousands of people."

In April 2024, the El Hiblu 3 received the Human Rights Defenders’ Award at the University of Malta.
