= Dannenröder Forst =

Coordinates: 50.775°N 9.019°E

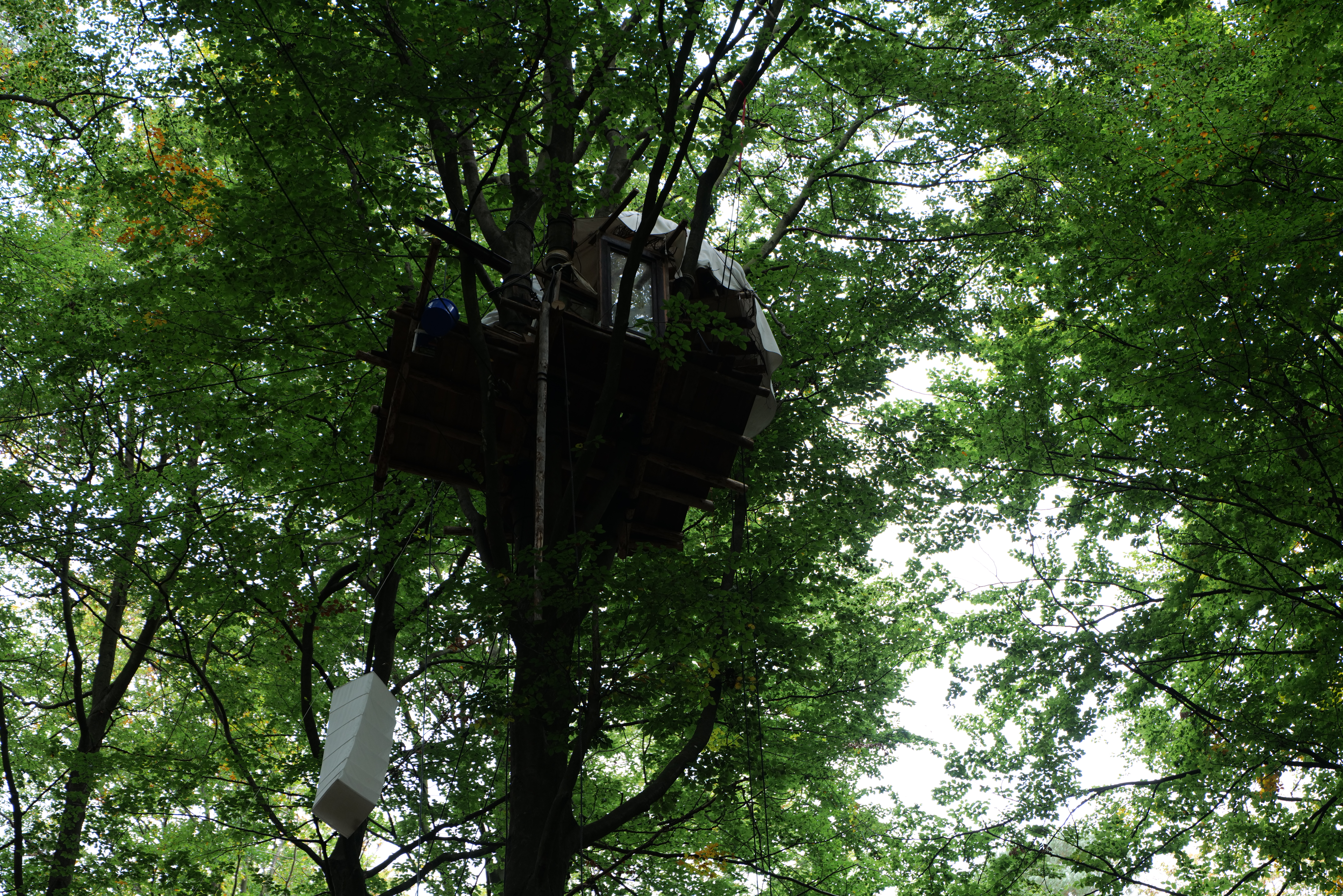

Dannenröder Forst, known in English as Dannenrod Forest, is in Germany. Protestors have opposed plans for a road through it.

A woman who took migrants into a port and who wrote a book about environmental activism is part of the group that occupied the area to protect it.

== See also ==
- Bundesautobahn 49 (A 49)
- Klimaliste
