= Martin Günther (politician) =

German politician (born 1982)

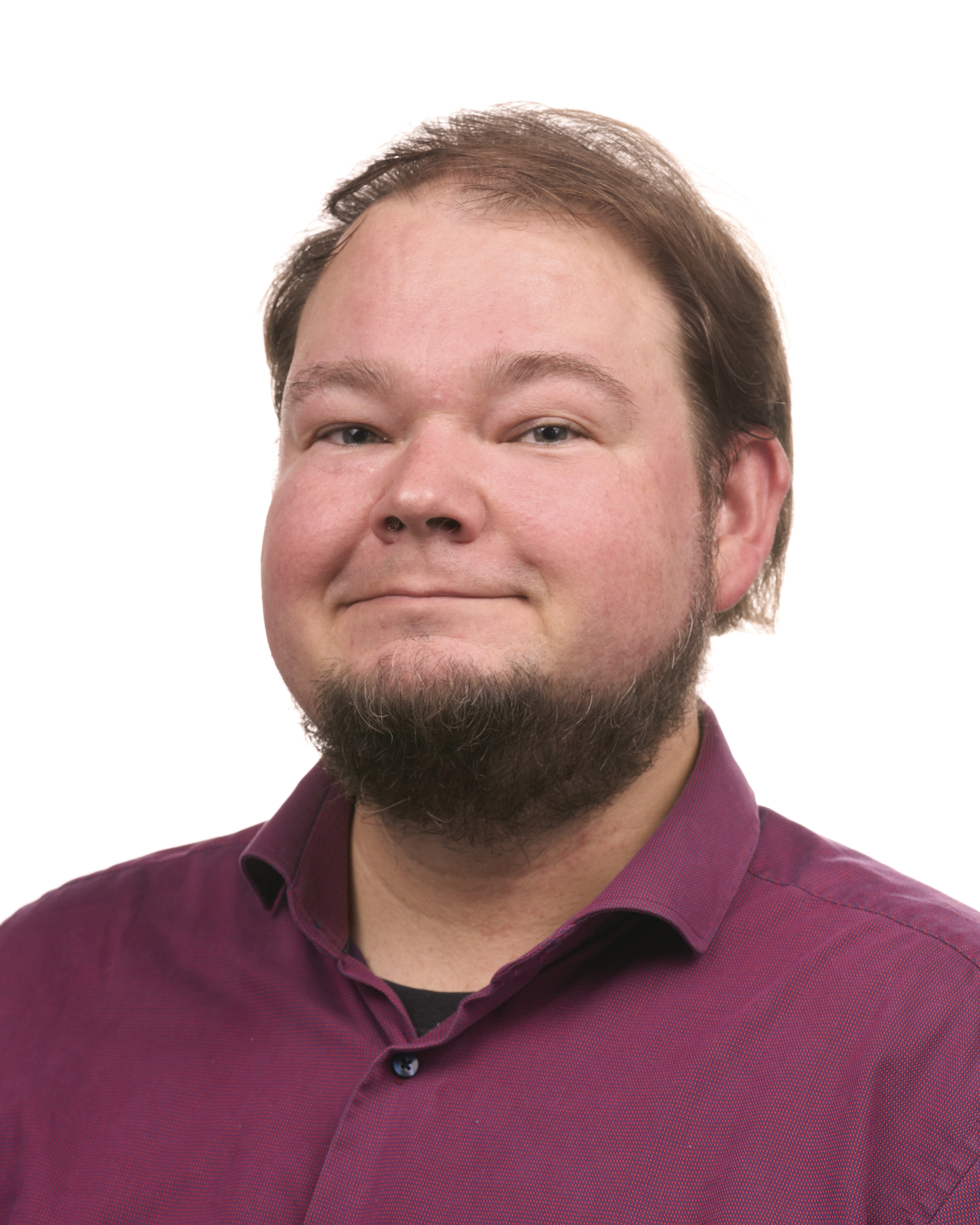

Member of the European Parliament
- Incumbent
- Assumed office 16 September 2025
- Preceded by: Carola Rackete
- Constituency: Germany

Personal details
- Born: 1982 (age 43–44)
- Party: Die Linke

Martin Günther (born 1982) is a German politician serving as a member of the European Parliament since 2025. From 2020 to 2022, he served as deputy chairman of The Left Brandenburg.

From 2013 to 2023, Günther was a member of the party's executive committee in Bernau bei Berlin and, from 2014, represented the Brandenburg state executive committee in various roles. He is a member of ver.di, Humanistischer Verband Deutschlands, and the Rosa Luxemburg Foundation.
