= Maria (1795 ship) =

Great Britain
- Name: Maria
- Owner: 1795:J. Potts; 1800:T.Brown
- Launched: 1795, Plymouth
- Fate: Last listed in 1815
- Notes: The British Library voyage summaries combines this Maria's EIC voyage with that of Maria (1804 ship)

General characteristics
- Tons burthen: 323, or 330 (bm)
- Armament: 1796: 6 × 6-pounder guns; 1810:8 × 18-pounder carronades

Maria was launched at Plymouth in 1795. She made one voyage to Bengal for the British East India Company (EIC). On her return she traded with the West Indies. She is last listed in the Register of Shipping in 1814, and in Lloyd's Register in 1815.

EIC voyage (1796-1798): Captain James Thomas Bishop sailed from Portsmouth on 12 April 1796, bound for Bengal. Maria reached the Cape of Good Hope on 7 November and arrived at Calcutta on 3 February 1797. Homeward bound, she was at Kedgeree on 22 July. She visited Penang on 20 August and reached the Cape on 14 December. From there, she reached Saint Helena on 3 January 1798 and arrived at The Downs on 17 March.

Year	Master	Owner	Trade	Source & notes
1796	Bishop	J. Potts	London–India	Lloyd's Register (LR)
1800	J.Bruton	T. Brown	London–Jamaica	LR
1805	J.Bruton	T. Brown	London–Jamaica	LR
1810	J.Bruton	T. Brown	London–Jamaica	LR
1810	Ferriman	T&R Brown	London transport	Register of Shipping; good repair 1804
1815	Ferriman	T. Brown	London transport	LR; last listed
