= Maria (1804 ship) =

History

United Kingdom
- Name: Maria
- Owner: Greenway & Co. (1804)
- Builder: Hudson and Bacon, Howrah
- Launched: 1804
- Captured: 1807
- Fate: Foundered 1838
- Notes: The British Library voyage summaries combines this Maria's EIC voyage with that of Maria (1795 ship)

General characteristics
- Tons burthen: 450, or 456 (bm)

Maria was launched at Calcutta in early 1804 and immediately sailed for London on a voyage for the British East India Company (EIC). The French captured her in 1807 and sold her to Arab merchants who renamed her Derreak Beggie. In 1810-11 she served as a transport in the British capture of Java. At some point she became Ruby; Ruby foundered in 1838.

== Career ==
EIC voyage (1804-1805): Captain William Brown Greenway sailed from Calcutta on 1 March 1804, bound for England. She was at Kedgeree on 22 July. She visited Penang on 29 July and reached Saint Helena on 22 October. She arrived at The Downs on 5 March 1805. Her owners paid c.£4210 for fitting out for her return voyage.

Maria was one of the EIC vessels that were part of the expedition under General Sir David Baird and Admiral Sir Home Riggs Popham that would in 1806 capture the Dutch Cape Colony. They would carry supplies and troops to the Cape, and then continue on their voyages.

The French frigate Piémontaise captured Maria on 27 September 1807. Between September and October, Piémontaise captured Caroline, Eggleton or Eggleson, master, Sarah, Henderson, master, Maria, James, master, Udny, Walteas or Wallis, master, Danneberg or Danesburgh, Winter, master, Highland Chief, Mahapice or Makepiece, master, Eliza, Sparkes, master, and Calcutta. Calcutta was a "native ship". Captain James, of Maria, died aboard Piémontaise on 29 September.

French records report that Maria was carrying toile, saltpêtre, and 8,500 sacks of rice. The value of the prize was 240,195.02 French francs.

In a process that currently remains obscure, Maria ended up in non-French hands under the name Derie Beggi (or a variant spelling).

The country ship Derie Beggi (of 500 tons (bm)) participated in the expedition to the Moluccas and Java in 1810-11. In 1810 Derriah Beggie (500 tons (bm); Captain Thomas Ross) embarked 70 horses belonging to His Majesty's 22nd (Light) Dragoons. The tail end of a heavy storm caught her with the result that 42 of the horses had to be destroyed.

At some point Derreak Beggie/Deriah Beggie/Derie Beggi became Ruby.

== Fate ==
Ruby, Randall, master, had been sailing from Canton to Bombay when she foundered near the Seychelles. The crew took to three boats. Jupiter rescued the people on one boat that was under the command of the first mate. Captain Randle and the men in the two other boats reached the Seychelles. In his deposition he stated that Ruby had developed leaks and despite the efforts of all to keep her afloat, including throwing her cargo overboard and pumping, she went down on 22 April 1838, at 5°43′S 64°40′E. She had been carrying some five lakhs of silver dollars and another lakh of gold. He brought 56 packages of gold with him in the ship's cutter, and put 65 packages of gold in the longboat. The men on the longboat were later tried at Bombay for having piratically stolen 22 packages of gold leaf.
