= VOS Hestia =

The VOS Hestia (sometimes BOS Hestia) is a deep-sea tug which operates under the Italian flag. The ship was used as a rescue ship for the British organisation Save the Children in the Mediterranean from 2016 to 2018 and rescued refugees fleeing by boat from distress at sea.

== Ship ==
The VOS Hestia is an anchor-handling tug and offshore supply vessel built in China in 2009. The bollard pull is 68.4 t. VOS Hestia is 59 metres (194 ft) long. The ship has powerful pumps and fire-fighting cannons. VOS Hestia is equipped for fighting oil spills. The ship is owned by Vroon Offshore Italia Srl and in 2021 sailed under the Italian flag; in 2025 the boat sailed under the flag of Tuvalu.

== Charter to Save the Children ==
The aid organisation Save the Children announced in August 2016 that it wanted to rescue refugees in the Mediterranean with its own rescue ship. The organisation chartered the VOS Hestia and was involved in the Italian-led sea rescue operation from September 2016. The ship was modified so that around 300 people can be accommodated.

The Italian company IMI Security Service provided security guards to protect the ship's crew. At the end of October 2017, the Italian police searched the VOS Hestia in the port of Catania on suspicion of "illegal behaviour by third parties". Save the Children stressed in a statement that the search was "material on crimes that are not currently related to our organisation"; nevertheless they announced the end of the operation.
