= Wolfgang Kaleck =

German civil rights attorney (born 1960)

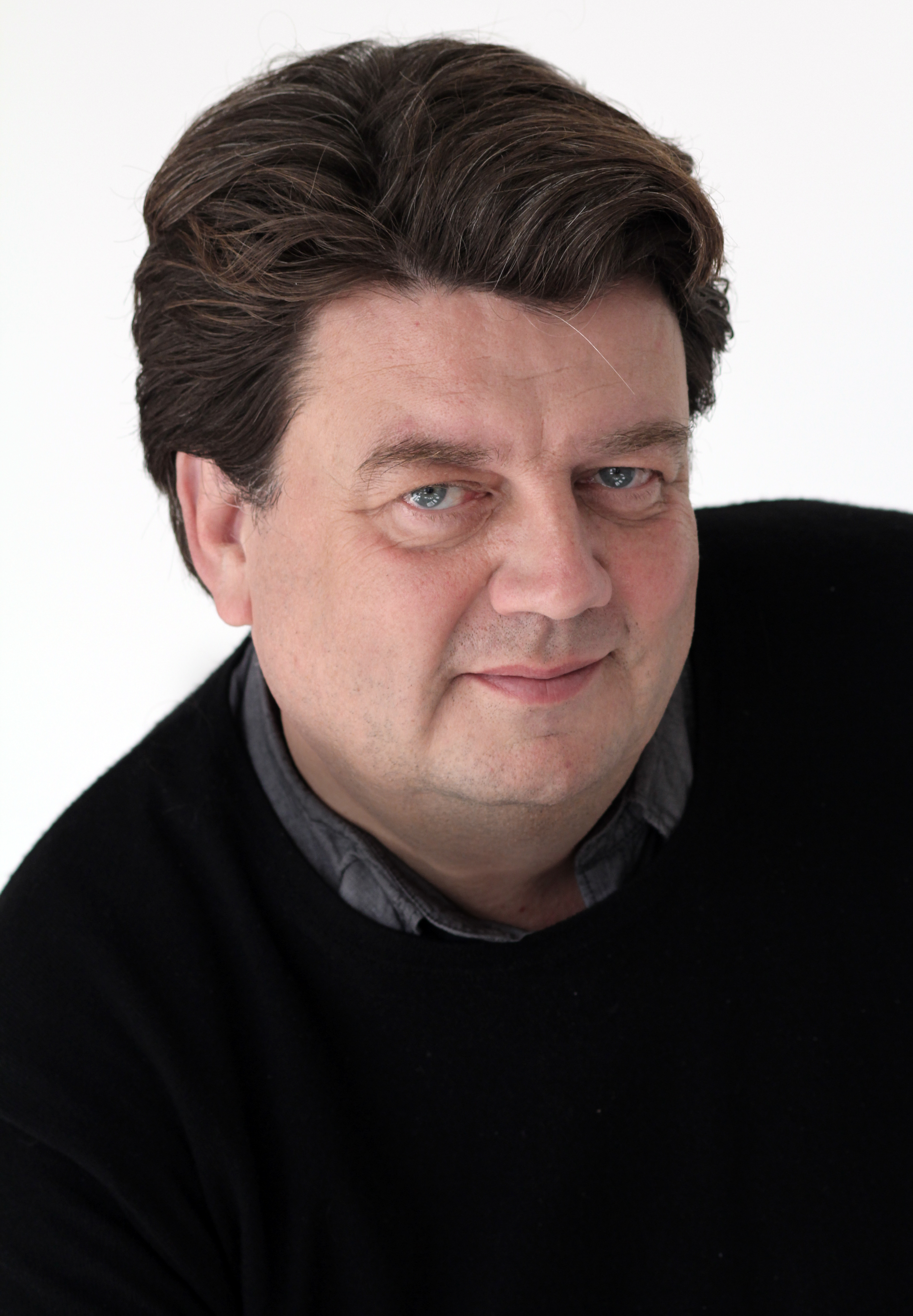
Wolfgang Kaleck

Wolfgang Kaleck (born 1960) is a German civil rights attorney. He is the founder as well as the general secretary for the European Center for Constitutional and Human Rights. He resides in Berlin, Germany.

After studying law at the University of Bonn, Kaleck completed part of his legal clerkship in Guatemala in 1990, where he worked at the human rights organization Comisión de Derechos Humanos de Guatemala. Back in Germany he first represented civil rights activists from former East Germany, who wanted to inspect their Stasi files, and later also victims of violent right-wing crimes. Beginning in 1998, he open cases in German jurisdiction to hold Argentinean military officers accountable for the murder and torture of victims of German origin at the time of the dictatorship. He also served as the federal chairman of the left-leaning German lawyers' guild, Republikanische Anwältinnen- und Anwälteverein.

On November 14, 2006, Kaleck sought, in cooperation with the Center for Constitutional Rights, criminal prosecution charges in a German court against a number of United States officials and military personnel in connection with alleged human rights abuses at the prison facilities Abu Ghraib and Guantanamo Bay on behalf of eleven plaintiffs. The widely publicized action targeted then-U.S. Defense Secretary Donald Rumsfeld and CIA chief George Tenet, as well as other high-ranking Pentagon officials. Kaleck accused them of committing war crimes and serious human rights violations against prisoners at Abu Ghraib. Rumsfeld wanted to cancel his participation in the Munich Security Conference because of a possible resulting prosecution in Germany. However, the complaint was rejected by the German Attorney General shortly before the conference. Subsequently, UN special rapporteur Leandro Despouy complained about the lack of independence of the German judiciary. In 2017, Kaleck, together with ECCHR, filed a criminal complaint to the German Attorney General against CIA Deputy Director Gina Haspel for her alleged involvement in torture.

Kaleck became known to a wider public because he represented the whistleblower Edward Snowden as a lawyer.

As of 2022 Kaleck is a scholar-in-residence at the Sorensen Center for International Peace and Justice at the CUNY School of Law in New York City.

In addition to his legal work, Kaleck publishes on topics including human rights policy, colonialism, and corporate responsibility. His texts have been published by Die Zeit, Der Spiegel, and Frankfurter Allgemein Zeitung. He is routinely asked for comment about human rights-related topics by reporters for many news organizations, like the New York Times.

== Awards ==
- 2014: Hermann Kesten Prize from the PEN Center Germany
- 2016: Hans Litten Prize from the Vereinigung Demokratischer Juristinnen und Juristen, together with Miriam Saage-Maaß
- 2017: The Bruno Kreisky Prize for Services to Human Rights
- 2018: Max Friedlaender Prize from the Bavarian Lawyers' Guild
- 2019: Bassiouni Justice Award from the Centre for International Law Research and Policy

== Publications ==
- Double Standards: International Criminal Law and the West .Torkel Opsahl Academic EPublisher (2015). ISBN 978-82-93081-67-8.
- Law Versus Power: Our Global Fight for Human Rights. OR Books (2019). ISBN 978-1682191736.
- (As co-editor) Colonial Wrongs and Access to International Law. Torkel Opsahl Academic EPublisher (2020). ISBN 978-8283481334.

== See also ==
- Command responsibility
- Enhanced interrogation
- Universal jurisdiction
