= Mala Emde =

German actress (born 1996)

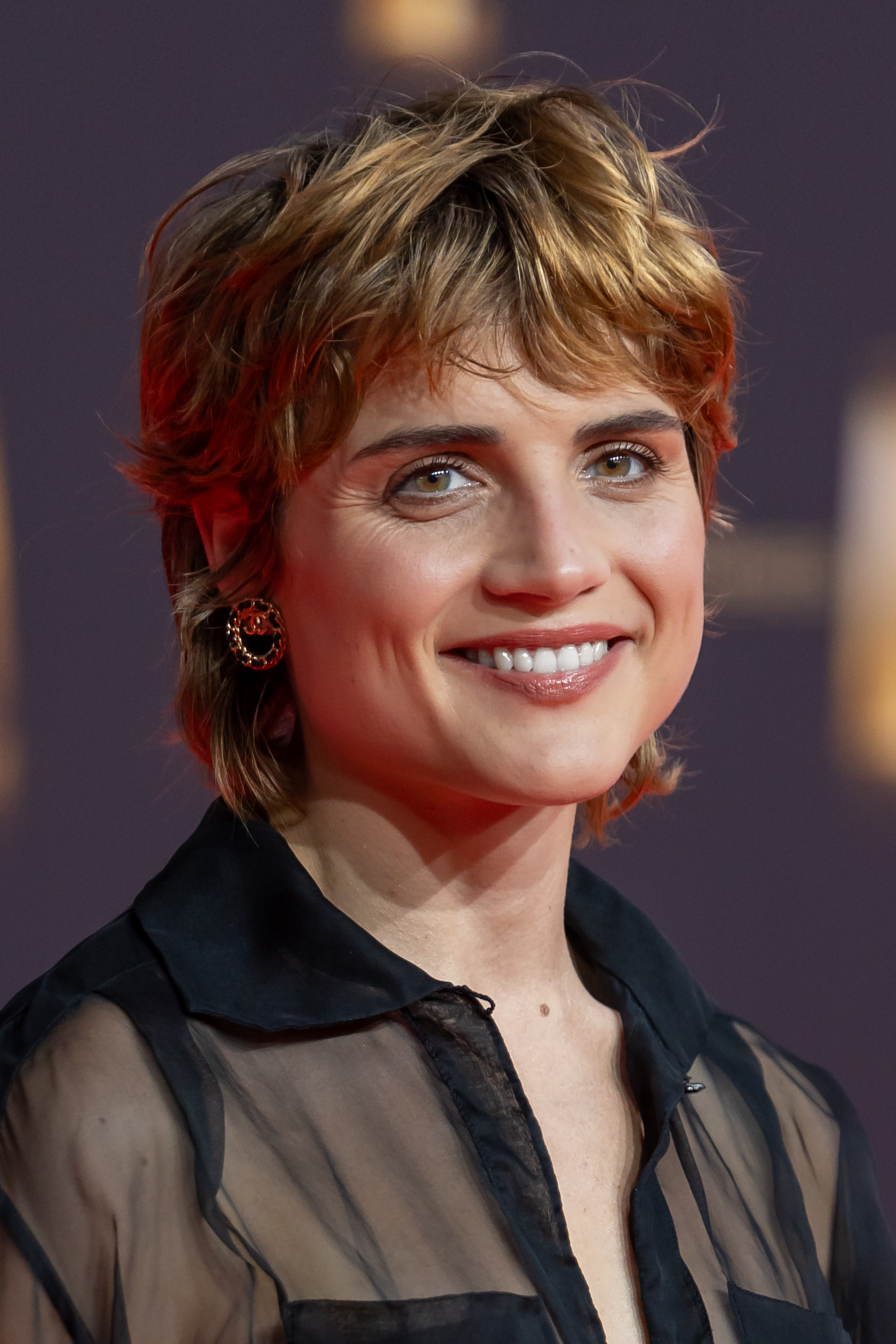
- Emde in 2024
- Born: April 22, 1996 (age 30); Germany
- Occupation: Actress

Mala Emde (born 22 April 1996) is a German actress.

== Life ==
Born in Frankfurt am Main to Thomas Emde and Cathrin Ehrlich, she has one elder sister. From 2009 to 2012 she attended the Tanz, Theater & Musik studio in Frankfurt am Main. Also there, she made her premiere as Aschenputtel in Janusz Głowacki's Die Aschenkinder and also as Tartalia in Friedrich Schiller's Turandot.

== Personal life ==
In May 2026, Emde announced a "friendship marriage" to her partner Trixi Strobel.

== Selected filmography ==
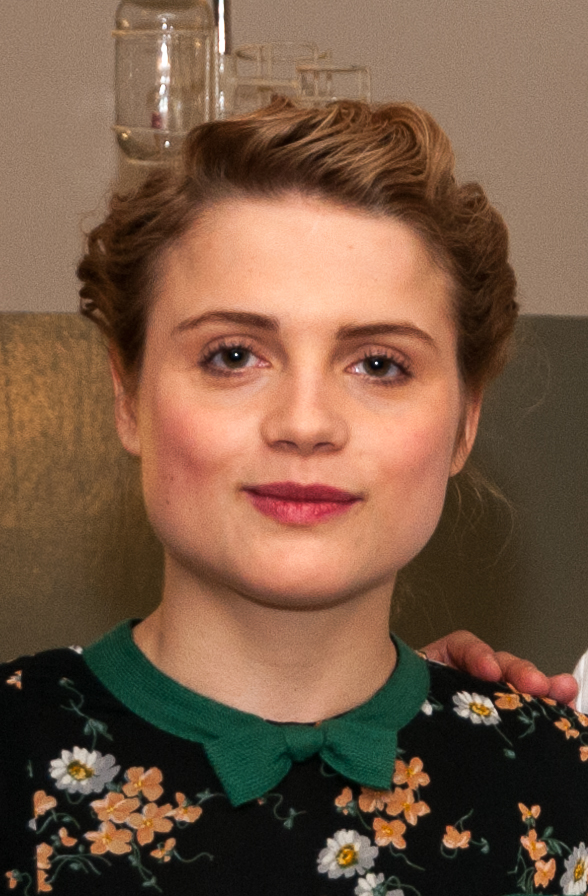
Mala Emde at the 2018 premiere of Charité

=== Films ===
- 2016: Offline: Are You Ready for the Next Level?
- 2017: Wir töten Stella
- 2018: 303
- 2019: Lara
- 2020: And Tomorrow the Entire World
- 2022: Skin Deep
- 2023: Blind at Heart
- 2025: Köln 75

=== TV series ===
- 2008: Post Mortem – Tod im OP
- 2009: Tatort – Architektur eines Todes
- 2011: Krimi.de – Der Zeuge/Eigentor
- 2012: Tatort – Schmuggler
- 2013: Krimi.de – Ehrensache
- 2013: Wenckes Verbrecher – Beiß nicht gleich in jeden Apfel
- 2014: Heldt – Letzte Runde
- 2014: SOKO Köln – Väter und Söhne
- 2015: SOKO 5113 – Opfer
- 2015: Notruf Hafenkante – Hund und Katze
- 2016: Tatort – Borowski und das verlorene Mädchen
- 2016: SOKO München – Zombie
- 2019: Charité
- 2020: The Defeated
- 2022: Oh Hell

=== TV films ===
- 2008: Der große Tom
- 2012: Mittlere Reife
- 2013: Sommer in Rom
- 2013: Das Paradies in uns
- 2015: My Daughter Anne Frank
- 2015: Nussknacker und Mausekönig
- 2016: Neben der Spur – Todeswunsch
- 2017: Luther and I
- 2019: Brecht

=== Other ===
- 2014: Grey Hat (short)
- 2015: Rose (short)
- 2018: Lehman. Gier frisst Herz (TV docudrama)

== Awards ==
- 2015: Bayerischer Fernsehpreis – Young Talent Award for her role as Anne Frank in My Daughter Anne Frank
- 2018: Filmkunstfest Mecklenburg-Vorpommern – Young Actor Award for 303
- 2020: Bisato d'Oro for And Tomorrow the Entire World
