= Forensic Oceanography =

Forensic Oceanography is a collaborative project between Lorenzo Pezzani and Charles Heller in which they "critically investigate the militarised border regime imposed by Europe across the Mediterranean Sea". Pezzani is an architect based in London and Heller is a film-maker based in Tunis. They began in 2011 within Forensic Architecture. Forensic Oceanography's investigations form the basis of reports and visual interpretations, which have been exhibited in art galleries and at art festivals in Europe.

== Projects ==
The Left-to-Die Boat (2011), about the European migrant crisis, "drew on an astonishing array of surveillance tools to document the case of a distressed migrant boat [. . .] without intervention from nearby Nato vessels, resulting in the death of 63 migrants." Laura Cumming, writing in The Observer, described it as:

a devastating film [. . .] charting the fate of a migrant boat adrift between Tripoli and Lampedusa for 14 days. The vessel is a twinkling light in a liquid blue swirl on the glowing screen before you. Other lights come and go in brilliant constellations. These are the positions of all the many planes, helicopters, Nato vessels and fishermen’s boats that flicker around the migrants but never draw close. A thousand documents could not say as much as this brief and sorrowfully beautiful film in which all the lights fade, leaving only the one little spark which eventually dies away, emblem of what is now known as the Left-to-Die Boat.

Blaming the Rescuers (2017) "dismantled allegations made by agencies such as Frontex and leading European politicians, who claimed charities were encouraging smugglers to use more dangerous tactics on the treacherous passage between Libya and Italy"; and "the idea that rescues by NGOs are to blame for an increase in migrants crossing."

== Group exhibitions ==
- Liquid Traces: The Left-to-Die Boat Case (2014) film was part of From Ear to Ear to Eye, Nottingham Contemporary, Nottingham, UK, 2018
- Liquid Violence was part of Manifesta 12, Palermo, Sicily, Italy, 2018
- The Left-to-die Boat and Death by Rescue were shown as part of Counter Investigations, an exhibition by Forensic Architecture at the Institute of Contemporary Arts, London, 2018
