= Forensic Architecture =

Multidisciplinary research group

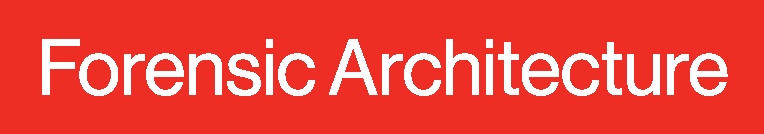
- Forensic Architecture Logo
- Established: 2010; 16 years ago
- Research type: Multidisciplinary
- Field of research: Architecture
- Director: Eyal Weizman
- Alumni: Susan Schuppli, John Palmesino, Lorenzo Pezzani
- Location: London, United Kingdom
- Operating agency: University of London
- Website: Official website

Forensic Architecture (FA) is a multidisciplinary research group based at Goldsmiths, University of London that uses architectural techniques and technologies to investigate cases of state violence and violations of human rights around the world. The group is led by architect Eyal Weizman. He received a Peabody Award in 2021 for his work with FA.

The agency develops new evidentiary techniques and undertakes advanced architectural and media research with and on behalf of communities affected by state violence, and routinely works in partnership with international prosecutors, human rights organisations and political and environmental justice groups. It consists of an interdisciplinary team of investigators including architects, scholars, artists, filmmakers, software developers, investigative journalists, archaeologists, lawyers, and scientists. It investigates alleged human rights violations by states or corporations on behalf of civil society groups. The group uses advanced architectural and media techniques to investigate armed conflicts and environmental destruction, as well as to cross-reference a variety of evidence sources, such as new media, remote sensing, material analysis, and witness testimony.

The term "forensic architecture" also refers to an academic field and an emergent field of practice developed at the Centre for Research Architecture, at Goldsmiths, University of London, concerning the production and presentation of architectural evidence, relating to buildings and urban environments and their media representations.

== History ==
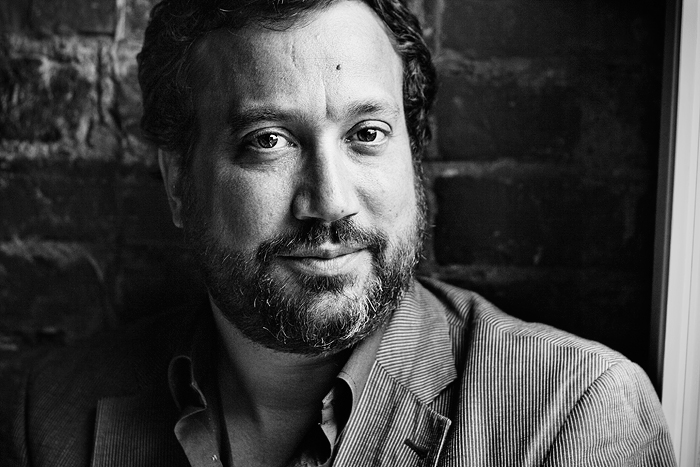
Eyal Weizman, the founder of FA and its current Director, in 2012

FA was formed in 2010 as a research project within the Centre for Research Architecture at Goldsmiths, University of London. The project developed as a response to several converging phenomena, such as the urbanisation of warfare, the erosion of trust in evidence in relation to state crimes and human rights violations, the emergence and proliferation of open source media (or 'image flotsam'), the increased use of smartphone footage in documenting human rights violations in urban conflict, and the need for civil society to have its own means of evidence production for application in law, politics and advocacy.

The first project undertaken by FA was an investigation into the killing of Bassem Abu Rahma in Bil'in, for human rights lawyer and activist Michael Sfard, which was eventually presented to the Supreme Court of Israel.

In 2011, FA was awarded funding for four years by the European Research Council. Also that year, a team within FA began to conduct investigations into the policies of European national and international authorities in relation to migration across the Mediterranean. That team, called Forensic Oceanography, published its first report in 2012, investigating of the deaths of seventy-three migrants who were left drifting for two weeks within NATO's maritime surveillance area.

In 2012, FA presented a report to a meeting of states party to the UN Convention on Certain Conventional Weapons on the use of airburst white phosphorus munitions in urban environments, in regard to the Israeli attacks on Gaza in December 2008 and January 2009, known as 'Operation Cast Lead'. The report eventually led Israel to admit for the first time the use of such munitions, and later to declare that the IDF would stop using white phosphorus munitions in populated areas. Also that year, the agency conducted an investigation with SITU Studio and the Bureau of Investigative Journalism titled 'Where the Drones Strike', on behalf of the UN Special Rapporteur on Counter Terrorism and Human Rights, Ben Emmerson.

In 2013, the project was awarded a second European Research Council grant to develop a multimedia data-aggregation and -visualisation platform called Pattrn. Pattrn enables its users to anonymously collate and share first-hand reports of events 'on the ground' and to make sense of information by combining and visualising different forms of media and information. The tool was employed by FA in their Gaza Platform, an interactive map of attacks by Israeli forces on Gaza between 8 July and 26 August 2014, developed in partnership with Amnesty International, as well as by organisations including as ACLED.

In 2015, in partnership with Amnesty International, FA collected and analysed mobile phone footage of hundreds of explosions in the city of Rafah, Gaza, during the city's 'Black Friday' of 1 August 2014. By analysing the shape and movement of bomb clouds captured in mobile phone footage, FA's researchers located and mapped hundreds of Israeli strikes on the city. The investigation exposed the Israeli military directive known as the Hannibal Directive, leading to its discontinuation.

In 2016, FA was awarded further funding by the European Research Council. That year, again in partnership with Amnesty International, FA conducted an investigation into Syria's Saydnaya Prison, interviewing surviving detainees who had been blindfolded or kept in darkness for most of the years they had spent in the space, and reconstructing the dimensions of the prison through a process of 'ear witnessing' and digital modelling.

In 2017, FA produced a video investigation into the presence of a member of the German intelligence services at the scene of the 2006 killing by neo-Nazis of a Turkish internet cafe owner. FA conducted physical experiments which cast doubt on the testimony of the secret service agent. The results of their video and written reports were ultimately referenced in both federal and state parliamentary inquiries in Germany, as well as the trial of the remaining NSU members in Munich.

In April 2018, it was announced that FA were one of four nominees for the 2018 Turner Prize for their work relating to the killing of Yacoub Abu Al-Qia'an in Umm al-Hiran, but ultimately they lost out to iPhone artist Charlotte Prodger.

In May 2018, in partnership with Bellingcat and Venezuelan journalists, FA collected, timed, and located nearly 70 pieces of evidence related to the El Junquito raid, including videos, photographs, leaked audio of police radio communications and official statements, asking for more material to determine if rebel police officer Óscar Pérez and his companions were victims of extrajudicial killings.

Fellows and PhD students who have been part of the FA programme include Susan Schuppli, John Palmesino, Lorenzo Pezzani and Charles Heller (co-founders of the Forensic Oceanography project), Lawrence Abu Hamdan, Anselm Franke, Ayesha Hameed, Thomas Keenan, Paulo Tavares, Francesco Sebregondi, Maayan Amir, Ariel Caine and Stefanos Levidis.

In 2019 as part of the Whitney Biennial, the group created a video piece critical of Whitney trustee member Warren Kanders. The video detailed Kanders' involvement in a company that produces tear gas used against nonviolent democratic protestors across the world. Kanders resigned from his position as Whitney board member shortly after the exhibition opened.

In October 2024, after monitoring and analysing Israel's war conduct in Gaza for more than a year, the group published a map detailing Israel's campaign in Gaza titled "A Cartography of Genocide", accompanied by an 827-page text report that concludes that "Israel's military campaign in Gaza is organised, systematic, and intended to destroy conditions of life and life-sustaining infrastructure". In 2026, FA was awarded The Golden Nica of Ars Electronica for the work.

In 2024 FA received a Right Livelihood Award for its lead in the development of new methodologies that combine technology with human rights advocacy.

FA has been named in the top 10 of the most influential people in the contemporary art world by Art Review in 2024 and 2025.

== Methods ==
FA describes forensic work as operating across three spaces: the field, the laboratory, and the forum. Lacking the privileges of the state's forensic process—access to crime scenes, resources, and the power to set the rules of evidence—the agency employs 'counter-forensics', the process of turning the 'forensic gaze' onto the actions of the state. This includes operating in multiple 'forums', or public spaces, engaging not only with parliamentary and juridical processes but also museums, art galleries, citizens' tribunals, and the media. The ways in which the investigations by FA oscillate between judicial proof and art work is subject of an ongoing theoretical debate on evidence, aesthetics, and third-generation institutional critique.

FA begins each case by conducting research from a range of sources, including: site visits, lidar scanning, photogrammetry and ground-penetrating radar, as well as the use of digital models to locate and synchronise source materials in space and time.

When citizens, journalists or participants in conflict record events using cameras or smartphones, they also inadvertently capture vast amounts of spatial information about the immediate environment. When a site is recorded from more than one angle the intersection provides information about depth and volume. The resultant architectural models will be the basis for locating and animating the movement of each camera/video, as well as the movement of protagonists in space.

FA engages witnesses using models as memory aids using 'situated testimony' methodology. The memory of witnesses/victims to violent events is often obscured by the experience of extreme violence, trauma and the general confusion of war. The entanglement of mediation and embodiment brings the witness back to the space and time of the incident, helping the recollection of previously forgotten details.

== Exhibitions ==
Selected major public exhibitions:

- Forensis, Haus der Kulturen der Welt, Berlin, 2014; Fundación Proa, Buenos Aires, 2015.
- Movie "77sqm_9:26min", documenta 14, Kassel, 2016.
- Forensic Architecture: Towards an Investigative Aesthetics, Barcelona Museum of Contemporary Art, 2017; University Museum of Contemporary Art, Mexico City, 2017. Its first major international exhibition.
- Counter Investigations: Forensic Architecture, Institute of Contemporary Arts, London, March–May 2018. A selection of their recent projects.
- London Design Biennale, September 2018.
- Whitney Biennial (New York City), July 2019.
- Video Essay "Cloud studies" for Critical Zones. Observatories for Earthly Politics, ZKM Center for Art and Media Karlsruhe, Karlsruhe, 2020.
- Cloud Studies, Whitworth Art Gallery, Manchester, 2021
- It Wasn't the Sea: 10 Years of Sea-Watch, Fabbrica del Vapore, Milan, 2025. Based on the IJ4EU Impact Awards 2024 winning investigation "The Pylos Shipwreck"
- All That We Have in Common, Museum of Contemporary Art (Skopje), Skopje, 2025
- Of Thread and Stone, New Taipei City Art Museum, Taipei, 2026
- Fractured Lifeworlds, Spore Initiative, Berlin, 2026
