= Phillip Frazer =

Australian writer

- Born: 1 May 1946 (age 80); Melbourne, Australia
- Education: Monash University
- Occupations: writer, editor, publisher
- Partner: Kate Veitch
- Children: Jackson Pullman Frazer; Zane Pullman Frazer
- Writing career
- Period: 1966–current
- Subjects: Politics, environment, Rock music, popular culture

Phillip Frazer (born 1 May 1946, in Melbourne, Australia) is a writer, editor and publisher. He was a founder of the weekly teen pop newspaper Go-Set in 1966, which was a popular Australian music paper from 1966 to 1974. He also published the more explicitly counterculture magazines Revolution, High Times and The Digger. He launched the Australian edition of Rolling Stone magazine, first as a supplement in Revolution in 1970, then as a full-fledged magazine in 1972. From 1976 to 2011, Frazer lived in the United States, where he launched and edited numerous political publications, most notably The Hightower Lowdown and Multinational Monitor.

== Biography ==
Phillip Frazer was born in Melbourne, Australia in 1946 and graduated Monash University with an arts degree majoring in politics. He co-edited the student newspaper Lot's Wife in 1965 with future parliamentarian Peter Steedman. Early in 1966, Frazer, fellow Monash student Tony Schauble, and local band manager Peter Raphael launched Go-Set, a teen-oriented pop music newspaper. The magazine was soon selling more than 70,000 copies a week, with more than 25 full-time staff in offices in Melbourne, Sydney, Brisbane, Adelaide and Perth. With the sole exception of the accountant, all the staff were under 30. Many went on to significant careers in journalism (Greg Quill, Vince Lovegrove), creative writing (Lily Brett, Jean Bedford, Damien Broderick), photography (Colin Beard, Grant Mudford), filmmaking (David Elfick, Bob Weis), graphic art (Ian McCausland) and television (Molly Meldrum). In 1970, Frazer used Go-Set's facilities to launch a counter-cultural monthly named Revolution, then negotiated with Rolling Stone owner and publisher Jann Wenner for several pages of that magazine to be included as a supplement. Frazer folded Revolution into a new magazine he called High Times in August 1971, then left Go-Set when, in February 1972, the paper's printer took a controlling interest. Later that year he launched the Australian Rolling Stone as a separate magazine, and then founded The Digger. (The Australian Rolling Stone is still publishing as of 2022.) With Frazer as the common thread, The Digger was produced by a frequently changing collective—including Bruce Hanford, Helen Garner, Ponch Hawkes, Colin Talbot, Garrie Hutchinson, Virginia Fraser, Sandra Goldbloom, and Isabelle Rosemberg, plus Hall Greenland, Grant Evans and Michael Zerman in the Sydney office—until December 1975, when it folded under the weight of too little money and too many lawsuits— including a libel suit from Builders Labourers union boss Norm Gallagher, another filed by a senior South Australian police official, and an obscenity case brought by the State of Victoria for Helen Garner's article describing a sex-education class. Frazer left Australia for the United States in July, 1976.

In New York, Frazer was an editor at Seven Days, a U.S. alternative newsmagazine, then worked on other U.S. political magazines including The Nation, the anti-nuclear-power organization No-Nukes, and in 1981-82 edited Ralph Nader's Multinational Monitor. In the 1990s he published the liberal Washington Spectator newsletter, and published, edited and wrote the environment newsletter News on Earth. In 1999 he founded The Hightower Lowdown with Jim Hightower. The Lowdown, with around 100,000 paying subscribers, is one of the biggest circulation political publications in the US, notable for its criticism of Bill Clinton's, George W. Bush's, Barack Obama's, and Donald Trump's administrations for being beholden to corporations and a corporatist ideology. Frazer published and co-edited the newsletter until August 2013 when he relocated to Australia where he writes for Griffith Review, the Byron Echo, dailyreview.com.au, and his blog at coorabellridge.com. In 2015 he joined a public debate on the role of the US government—through its intelligence and diplomatic agencies — in the overthrow of the Australian Labor Party government in 1975. He updated his 1984 account of that event, published in Mother Jones magazine, with updates from evidence that emerged after the death of former Prime Minister Gough Whitlam and the publication of the novel "Amnesia" by Peter Carey. The updated text is on his blog coorabellridge.com and will be further expanded in his memoir

== Personal life ==
Frazer has a son and a daughter from a long-term relationship with New York educator and economist, Dr Cydney Pullman. His partner since 2004 is Australian author, Kate Veitch, who has published two novels Listen (2008) re-titled Without a Backward Glance in the US, and Trust (2009), as well as essays published in The Griffith Review.
