= Too Many Men (novel) =

1999 novel by Australian author Lily Brett

- First edition
- Author: Lily Brett
- Language: English
- Genre: novel
- Publisher: Pan Macmillan, Australia
- Publication date: 1999
- Publication place: Australia
- Media type: Print (Paperback)
- Pages: 714
- ISBN: 0330361392
- Preceded by: Just Like That
- Followed by: You Gotta Have Balls

Too Many Men (1999) is a novel by Australian author Lily Brett. It won the Commonwealth Writers' Prize in 2000 for the Best Book from the South-East Asia and South Pacific Region. The novel was adapted into a feature film by the German director Julia von Heinz. Titled as Treasure, the film was presented at the 74th Berlin International Film Festival in the Berlinale Special Gala section in February 2024. The movie had its US premiere at the Tribeca Film Festival on May 8, 2024. William Morrow published a movie edition of the book, retitled, "Treasure" in May 2024.

== Plot summary ==
Ruth Rothwax, a successful New York business-woman, takes her 80-year-old father Edek, a Holocaust survivor living in Melbourne, back to Poland, to revisit the land of his birth. They are also accompanied, unknown to Edek, by the ghost of the dead Nazi Rudolf Höss. The novel explores the two main characters' different responses to what they find.

== Reviews ==
- Publishers' Weekly noted: "The hardest effect to bring off in fiction is a vision that is at once tender, deeply comic and yet aware of the ultimate sadness of life, the lachrymae rerum. Brett has succeeded triumphantly in the most delightful surprise of the year so far."
- Shannon Dowling in Journal of the Association for the Study of Australian Literature stated: "Too Many Men represents a culmination of the concerns of [Brett's] work — the legacies of the Holocaust; the concentration and death camp Auschwitz-Birkenau; inter-generational trauma; and continuing anti-Semitism."

== Awards and nominations ==
- 1999 shortlisted Booksellers Choice Award
- 2000 winner Commonwealth Writers' Prize South East Asia and South Pacific Region — Best Book
- 2000 shortlisted Miles Franklin Award
