= Jessica Rankin =

Australian artist (born 1971)

- Born: 1971 (age 54–55); Sydney, Australia
- Notable work: White Cube
- Style: Embroidery on organdy, other mediums
- Parent(s): David Rankin, Jennifer Rankin
- Relatives: Lily Brett

Jessica Rankin (born 1971, Sydney) is an Australian artist who lives and works in New York. She has participated in numerous group exhibitions in the US, Europe and Australia, including White Cube, London (2007), MoMA PS1, New York (2006) and Franklin Artworks, Minneapolis (2005). Rankin is best known for her organdy embroidery, although she also produces works in other mediums.

== Personal life ==
Rankin's father is the artist David Rankin, and her mother is poet and playwright Jennifer Rankin. Her step-mother is author and poet Lily Brett. Rankin shares her studio with her partner, artist Julie Mehretu.

== Work ==
Incorporating embroidery and needlework, Rankin's work and her organdy 'embroidered paintings' feature a series of 'mental maps' with codes, signs, and symbols that explore ideas of memory, intuition, and interpretation. Key embroidered works include Nocturne (2004), Hour to Hour (2007), Everything is Still There (2005) and Passage (Dusty Humming) (2007), which presented a new style of embroidered work focusing solely on text rather than text with image.

Rankin also creates drawings and watercolors that offer information on the process. Sketches of biomorphic forms are featured alongside abstract representations of astral or lunar cycles, while other studies depict recognizable scenery. Rankin's first European show at White Cube in 2007 highlighted this side of Rankin's practice by displaying 88 drawings and watercolors in their Hoxton Square gallery. Key works on paper include Cloud & Sun (2003), San Miguel (2005), Word Construction (2005), Leaves (2006), Rockface (2006) and Couple (2006).

== Solo exhibitions ==
- 2007 White Cube, London
- 2006 The Measure of Every Pause, P.S. 1 Contemporary Arts Center, Long Island City, NY
- 2005 Franklin Artworks, Minneapolis, MN
- 2004 The Project, New York, NY
- 1999 First Floor Gallery, Melbourne, Australia
