= I'm Off Then (film) =

- Theatrical release poster
- Directed by: Julia von Heinz
- Screenplay by: Jane Ainscough; Sandra Nettelbeck; Christoph Silber
- Story by: Hape Kerkeling
- Based on: I'm Off Then: Losing and Finding Myself on the Camino de Santiago by Hape Kerkeling
- Produced by: Hermann Florin; Nico Hofmann; Jochen Laube; Sebastian Werninger
- Starring: Devid Striesow
- Cinematography: Felix Poplawsky
- Edited by: Alexander Dittner; Georg Söring
- Music by: Alexander Geringas; Joachim Schlüter
- Production companies: UFA Fiction; Warner Bros. Film Productions Germany; Feine Filme
- Distributed by: Warner Bros. Pictures
- Release date: 24 December 2015 (Germany)
- Running time: 92 minutes
- Country: Germany
- Language: German
- Box office: $17 million

I'm Off Then (German: Ich bin dann mal weg) is a 2015 German film directed by Julia von Heinz, based on the book I'm Off Then: Losing and Finding Myself on the Camino de Santiago by Hape Kerkeling. It explores the physical and spiritual comeback of Kerkeling from an existential crisis as he pilgrims on a path to Santiago de Compostela.

== Cast ==
- Devid Striesow as Hape Kerkeling
  - Noah Wiechers as teenager Hape
  - Luis Kain as young Hape
- Martina Gedeck as Stella
- Karoline Schuch as Lena
- Katharina Thalbach as Omma Bertha
- Annette Frier as Dörte
- Anna Stieblich as Babbel
- Heiko Pinkowski as Bernd
- Inez Bjørg David as Siri
- Julia Engelmann as Line
- Moritz Knapp as Achim
- Birol Ünel as Americo

== Accolades ==
| Year | Award / Film Festival | Category | Recipient(s) | Result | Ref(s) |
|---|---|---|---|---|---|
| 2016 | Jupiter Award | Best German Actor | Devid Striesow | Won | |
| 2016 | Jupiter Award | Best German Actress | Karoline Schuch | Nominated | |
