= Good Thing Going Productions =

American production company

Good Thing Going
- Logo used since 2024
- Industry: Motion pictures, Entertainment
- Founded: 2019; 7 years ago
- Founder: Lena Dunham
- Headquarters: New York City
- Key people: Lena Dunham; Michael P. Cohen; Marissa Diaz; Liz Watson; Soham Joglekar

Good Thing Going Productions is an American production company founded by Lena Dunham.

== History ==
Lena Dunham and Jenni Konner, longtime producing partners, announced the end of their professional collaboration in 2018. The following year, entertainment trade publications reported that Dunham had founded Good Thing Going with a first-look deal for HBO, with whom Dunham previously had produced Girls and Camping.

== Productions ==
=== Film ===
Films produced by Good Thing Going
Year	Title	Director
2022	Sharp Stick	Lena Dunham
2022	Catherine Called Birdy	Lena Dunham
2024	Treasure	Julia von Heinz
2026	Good Sex	Lena Dunham

=== Television ===
Television produced by Good Thing Going
Year	Title	Network	Notes
2018	Camping	HBO	—N/a
2020	Industry	HBO	Pilot episode only
2021	Generation	HBO Max	—N/a
2022	Orgasm Inc: The Story of OneTaste	Netflix	TV documentary
2025	Too Much	Netflix	In production
TBA	Covers	Netflix	In development
