= Go-Set =

Australian pop music newspaper

- Go-Set logo 1969–1972
- Former editors: Tony Schauble; Phillip Frazer; Doug Panther; Jon Hawkes; Colin James; Piotre Olszewski; Ed Nimmervoll; Jenny Irvine
- Categories: pop music
- Frequency: Weekly
- Publisher: Go-Set Publications; Waverley Press; Sungravure; IPC
- First issue: 2 February 1966
- Final issue: 24 August 1974
- Country: Australia
- Based in: Malvern, Victoria, Australia; St Kilda; Carlton; Sydney, New South Wales

Go-Set was the first Australian pop music newspaper, published weekly from 2 February 1966 to 24 August 1974, and was founded in Melbourne by Phillip Frazer, Peter Raphael and Tony Schauble. Widely described as a pop music "bible", it became an influential publication, introduced the first national pop record charts and featured many notable contributors including fashion designer Prue Acton, journalist Lily Brett, rock writer / band manager Vince Lovegrove, music commentator Molly Meldrum, rock writer / music historian Ed Nimmervoll and radio DJ Stan Rofe. It spawned the original Australian edition of Rolling Stone magazine in late 1972.

== History ==
=== Foundation: 1964–1967 ===
1st issue, 2 February 1966

In 1964, Monash University student newspaper Chaos' co-editors, John Blakeley, Damien Broderick and Tony Schauble, renamed the paper Lot's Wife. Phillip Frazer was a staffer and later became co-editor with future parliamentarian Peter Steedman. Late in 1965, Schauble, Frazer, Broderick, and another student writer, Doug Panther, discussed ideas to make money during the holidays including the idea to create a teen-oriented pop music newspaper. Local rock group The Mood's manager, Peter Raphael, joined Frazer and Schauble and together they founded Go-Set Publications. Raphael brought in photographer Colin Beard and advertising manager Terry Cleary. Waverley Press, which owned Waverley Offset Printers, had printed Lot's Wife, and agreed to print Go-Set on credit. Schauble, Frazer and Panther produced the newspaper from their home in the Melbourne suburb of Malvern.

The first edition of Go-Set, dated 2 February 1966, was published with Schauble cited as editor because Frazer, a medical student, asked to be listed in the low-key role of designer and Panther, who had not registered for the military draft, was described as a feature writer. The first issue showcased Tom Jones (see right) and Herman's Hermits interviewed by Panther and photographed by Colin Beard at Palais Theatre, St Kilda. Initial sales were low, about 3000 to 5000 but Issue 3, which covered The Rolling Stones tour in Melbourne and Sydney, doubled their sales.

Initially Go-Set was intended for Melbourne distribution only. A book distributor, Bill Robinson, managed circulation throughout Victoria, and several weeks later the newspaper was introduced to Sydney and within its first year, all the remaining states. From 28 February 1966, the Go-Set office was three rooms at Charnwood Crescent, St Kilda until December 1970 when it relocated to Drummond Street, Carlton. Key staff included Tony Schauble as editor then manager, Phillip Frazer, who had switched to an arts degree at Monash, as co-editor, and Colin Beard as photographer. Peter Raphael was advertising manager assisted by Terry Cleary. Doug Panther continued as feature writer for several months before leaving for Western Australia with Commonwealth Police and the Australian Army searching for him as a 'draft dodger'. Panther was replaced by Lily Brett who likes to recall that she got the job because she had a car. Other personnel were Honey Lea, originally a typist, who later became fashion editor when Prue Acton dropped out, and Sue Flett who wrote an advice column under the name Leslie Pixie.

Ian "Molly" Meldrum wrote his first story for Go-Set in July 1966, and joined as a news, gossip and feature writer in August. Frazer urged Meldrum to join week day, TV show Kommotion on Channel 0 as a mimer so that Go-Set could get more inside stories. A key element in the early success of the newspaper was the centre page spread called "The Scene-The Seen", a weekly pictorial survey photographed by Beard in Melbourne and Grant Mudford in Sydney around the discos and dance halls. These were its original target audience - the thousands of teenagers, especially girls, caught up in the excitement of the Swinging Sixties, following their favourite local Rock group around the suburban dancehalls of Melbourne. Go-Set started its annual pop poll in October 1966 with readers voting for Normie Rowe as 'Best Male Vocal', Lynne Randell as 'Best Girl Vocal' and The Easybeats as 'Best Group'. The following year, Normie Rowe was crowned as the inaugural 'King of Pop' on TV series The Go!! Show, also on Channel 0.

Go-Set had become the indispensable chronicle of the local scene, described by Jim Keays, lead singer of The Masters Apprentices, as the Australian music bible. From 5 October 1966, it featured Australian singles charts and international charts, local state gig listings and record reviews.

Go-Set developed an international focus when, in a promotional arrangement with BOAC airlines, Brett and Beard were flown to London and the USA. They spent four months in the United Kingdom from January 1967 touring with Australian singer Normie Rowe, and The Troggs, The Who, The Small Faces, The Easybeats and others.

In America they covered the New York City scene and attended the Monterey Pop Festival from 16 to 19 June 1967. The first full colour centre spread was a Beard photograph of Jimi Hendrix taken at The Monterey Pop Festival. In Los Angeles they did personality stories and photographic fashion spreads with Sonny and Cher, The Mamas & the Papas and covered a recording session with The Byrds. In Brett's absence, Meldrum became the principal local feature writer while Vera Kaas-Jager covered the local photography for Beard.

=== Offshoots: 1968–1973 ===
August 1972

Over its nine-year history there were many significant additional contributors including David Elfick, Alex Pezzoni, Vince Lovegrove, Ed Nimmervoll, Stan Rofe, Stephen MacLean, Wendy Saddington, Michele O'Driscoll (aka Mitch), Cleo Calvo (now singer, Clelia Adams), Eril Bilson, Philip Morris (photographer), Ian McCausland (graphics), Jon Hawkes (editor), Geoff Pendlebury (graphics), Geoff Watson (management) and his off-sider Margaret Rose Dunphy on bookkeeping and classifieds, Helen Hooper, Jean Bedford, and Pat Wilson who wrote under the pen-name of "Mummy Cool" (1971–1972). Maree Menzel wrote quirky pages covering fashion and accessories, and often modelled for the illustrations as well, photographed by Ray Strong.

Ian "Molly" Meldrum wrote a weekly column for Go-Set from August 1966 until its demise in 1974. His writing style represented his own stream of consciousness and came across in the same "bumbling" manner which was to later be a hallmark of his public persona. His nickname "Molly" was given to him and first published in Go-Set in 1968 by fellow columnist and radio DJ Stan Rofe. Both Meldrum's and Rofe's columns contained many camp in jokes. Meldrum became editor of a monthly Go-Set offshoot, Gas, which was aimed at younger teen girls and was first published in October 1968 with a feature on The Monkees; its last issue was in March 1971.

Nimmervoll, an architecture student, started with Go-Set as the compiler of the national Top 40 charts, beginning in February 1967. He then wrote feature stories and record reviews, and in December 1969 began editing Go-Set's counter-culture supplement, Core, which was influenced by the US magazine Rolling Stone.

Founders, Schauble and Beard had left by February 1969 and Frazer became editor and publisher; Jon Hawkes joined as co-editor in April. Frazer launched two monthly counter-culture magazines, Revolution, which lasted from 1 May 1970 – 1 August 1971, and High Times, co-founded with Macy McFarland and Pat Woolley, which published August 1971 – 1 January 1972. Frazer left Go-Set in February 1972 (after Waverley Press took control of the company) and founded The Digger in September 1972. Frazer also launched the Australian edition of Rolling Stone magazine first as a supplement in the fourth issue of Revolution, then as a fully-fledged magazine in early 1972. Frazer left Rolling Stone Australia in 1974 but continued with The Digger until December 1975, after which he moved to United States.

Go-Set reached its peak in circulation, with 72,000 copies per week, in June to December 1970. After Frazer left as editor in 1972 to concentrate on The Digger, Piotre Olszewski was editor from May to July before Nimmervoll took over with Meldrum as co-editor. Nimmervoll remained until December 1973 when Sungravure Ltd bought Go-Set and relocated its headquarters to Sydney.

=== Last edition and beyond: 1974–current ===
In December 1973, Nimmervoll left Go-Set and founded Juke Magazine in 1975. Subsequently, he established Take 40 Australia and, since 2000, he has edited HowlSpace, a website detailing Australian rock music history. He is also an author of books on the same subject.

By January 1974, Go-Set was sold to Sungravure Ltd (part of the Fairfax company), with Jenny Irvine as editor. Reprints from UK and US papers replaced staff writing during 1973 and 1974. Sungravure was taken over by IPC Magazines, after which Go-Set's circulation declined with the final issue being on 24 August 1974.

Meldrum remained to the last issue and became an integral part of Australian Broadcasting Corporation TV pop music series Countdown, which began broadcasting nationally in November 1974. He initially worked behind the scenes as a "Talent Co-ordinator" but, from 1975, he became an on-screen host and developed a news and gossip segment titled Humdrum. Countdown re-united Meldrum with Grant Rule from his Kommotion days. After Countdown ended in 1987, Meldrum continued his music commentary for various TV shows, including Hey Hey Its Saturday.

Frazer has edited and managed political magazines in America and, with Jim Hightower, published The Hightower Lowdown, a progressive political newsletter, from 1999 through 2013, after which he returned to Australia.

In 2012, Brett published Lola Bensky, her sixth novel, a semi-autobiographical work of fiction based on her experiences as a writer for Go-Set. The book was long-listed for the Miles Franklin Literary Award, and won the 2014 Prix Medicis étranger in France.

== Go-Set Australian national charts ==
From March 1966, Go-Set published radio station 3UZ's Top 40 singles for Melbourne and 2SM's King 40 for Sydney. A national Top 40 chart appeared on 5 October 1966 alongside top 15s from 2SM, 3UZ, 4BC in Brisbane, 5AD in Adelaide and 6KY in Perth. In February 1967, Ed Nimmervoll compiled the national chart, with commentary and statistics. The newspaper began publishing Australia's first national weekly album chart on 23 May 1970.

In May 1974, the first Kent Music Report was published by David Kent, which became Australia's official national charts. The Kent Music Report appeared just before the last Go-Set charts were published on 24 August 1974.
