= You Gotta Have Balls =

2005 novel by Australian author Lily Brett

- Author: Lily Brett
- Publisher: Picador
- ISBN: 9780330421966

You Gotta Have Balls is a 2005 novel by Australian writer Lily Brett.

Ruth Rothwax is a character that has appeared in Brett's novels Just Like That and Too Many Men. In this novel, Rothwax lives in New York and runs a successful letter-writing business. The story, although told from her point of view, mainly concerns her father, Edek. He moves to New York and, with Zofia and Walentyna, two Polish women who have won green cards, sets up a meatball restaurant named You Gotta Have Balls that becomes a successful enterprise.
