= Roxon =

Roxon is a surname. Notable people with the surname include:

- Katarina Roxon (born 1993), Canadian swimmer
- Lillian Roxon (1932–1973), Australian journalist and author
- Nicola Roxon (born 1967), Australian politician
