= Karoline Schuch =

German actress (born 1981)

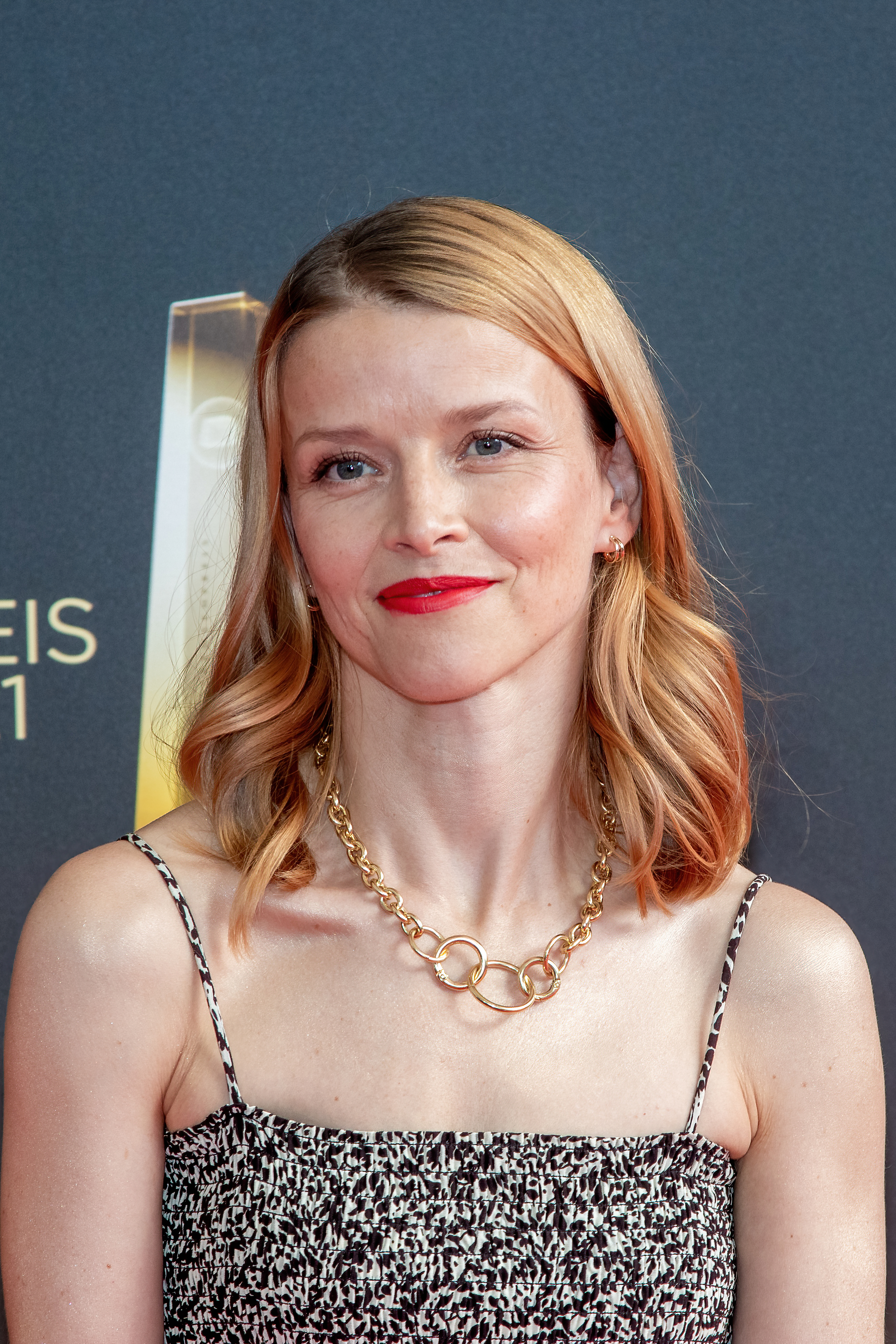
- Schuch at the 2021 Deutscher Fernsehpreis
- Born: 19 October 1981 (age 44); Jena, East Germany
- Occupation: Actress
- Years active: 2002–present
- Relatives: Albrecht Schuch (brother)

Karoline Schuch (born 19 October 1981) is a German actress. She has appeared in more than 50 films and television shows since 2002. She is the sister of actor Albrecht Schuch.

== Selected filmography ==
- Zeiten ändern dich (2010)
- Men Do What They Can (2012)
- Guardians (2012)
- Hanna's Journey (2013)
- Ich bin dann mal weg (2015)
- Luther and I (2017, TV film)
- Balloon (2018)
