= Lillian Roxon =

Australian music journalist (1932-1973)

- Lillian Roxon in 1965
- Born: 8 February 1932; Alassio, Italy
- Died: 10 August 1973 (aged 41); New York City, US
- Occupations: Journalist, writer
- Notable work: Lillian Roxon's Rock Encyclopedia (1969)

Lillian Roxon (8 February 1932 – 10 August 1973) was an Australian music journalist and author, best known for Lillian Roxon's Rock Encyclopedia (1969).

== Early life ==
Roxon was born Lillian Ropschitz in Alassio, Province of Savona, Italy. Her family, originally from Lwów in Ukraine, then Poland, moved to the coastal town of Alassio in Italy. As the Ropschitz family were Jewish, they migrated to Australia in 1937 to escape the rise of fascism, and settled in Brisbane. Shortly after their arrival, the family anglicised their names; the surname Roxon was Lillian's suggestion.

Roxon studied at the University of Queensland, where she met and had a brief affair with Zell Rabin, who gave Lillian her first job in the United States and who became a key associate of media magnate Rupert Murdoch in the early 1960s. She pursued further studies at the University of Sydney from 1949, where she developed an affinity for the cultural movement known as the Sydney Push, then congregating at the Lincoln Inn.

In the process, Roxon attracted the attention of an Australian Security Intelligence Organisation (ASIO) operative and was identified in June 1951 as a communist sympathiser. She began her career in newspapers in Sydney and for several years worked for the tabloid magazine Weekend, owned by newspaper magnate Sir Frank Packer and edited by journalist and author Donald Horne.

In 1959, Roxon moved permanently to New York City, becoming the first Australian female overseas correspondent and the first Australian journalist to establish a high profile in the U.S. From 1962 onward, she was the New York correspondent for The Sydney Morning Herald and over the next ten years she carved out a career reporting on arts, entertainment and women's issues for the Australian, American and British press.

== Career ==
In the mid-1960s, Roxon became fascinated by pop music and the rise of groups like the Beatles, the Byrds and the Rolling Stones and she began to write regular articles on the subject. In early 1967, she visited San Francisco and was one of the first mainstream journalists to write about the nascent hippie movement, filing a landmark story for The Herald on the subject. She also contributed to Oz magazine along with the short lived Eye magazine in the late 1960s.

During the late 1960s and early 1970s, Roxon became close friends with critic and rock manager Danny Fields, Village Voice journalist Blair Sabol, musician and writer Lenny Kaye (later the guitarist in Patti Smith's band and compiler of the original Nuggets LP), music journalist Lisa Robinson, photographers Linda McCartney and Leee Black Childers and Australian academic, author and feminist Germaine Greer.

In 1965, Roxon was joined by The Sydney Morning Herald's autocratic foreign correspondent Margaret Jones. It was a clash of two unbending personalities which her biographer Robert Milliken described as "like two sopranos sharing the same stage". Perhaps to keep these two apart, Margaret was posted to Washington the following year.

Linda McCartney (then Linda Eastman) was one of Roxon's closest female friends and she did much to further Eastman's career, but the friendship ended abruptly in 1969 when Eastman moved to London, married Paul McCartney and cut all ties with her former friends, a move which wounded Roxon deeply. Roxon eventually retaliated, four years later, with a scathing review of the McCartneys' first American television special. Published in the New York Sunday News on 22 April 1973, Roxon's review panned the documentary and poured scorn on Linda, slamming her for being "catatonic with horror at having to mingle with ordinary people", "disdainful if not downright bored ... her teeth relentlessly clamped in a Scarsdale lockjaw", and "incredibly cold and arrogant".

During 1968-69, Roxon was commissioned to write what became the world's first rock encyclopaedia, published by Grosset & Dunlap in late 1969, and the work for which she is best remembered.

== 1970s ==
In the early 1970s, Roxon's profile expanded and she became more widely known for her feminist writing. She wrote a groundbreaking and highly personal report about the August 1970 women's rights march in New York, which was published in The Sydney Morning Herald under the title "There is a tide in the affairs of women". She wrote a regular column on sex and sexuality for Mademoiselle magazine (which continued after her death) and in 1971 she hosted a rock radio show that was syndicated to 250 stations. In late 1972, Roxon met and became friends with David Bowie and his first wife Angie on Bowie's Ziggy Stardust Tour, his first tour of the U.S., and was a major champion of Bowie's music in the American press as he was trying to break into the U.S. market.

Roxon's health declined during the early 1970s. She made what would be her last visit to Australia in early 1973. While she was in Sydney in early February she was interviewed by Australian Broadcasting Corporation (ABC) journalists Jeune Pritchard and Gary Hyde for the ABC's pop magazine program GTK. The shorter Jeune Pritchard interview was included in a special on the current Australasian tour by The Rolling Stones, and showed Roxon looking unwell. In the longer Gary Hyde interview, Roxon was questioned about the current state of rock music in general; in response to Hyde's questions about up-and-coming acts, she cited the New York Dolls and the then-unknown Bette Midler as names to watch.

One of Roxon's last print articles reported on Iggy Pop and the Stooges's landmark concerts at Max's Kansas City in New York and her final piece, filed in early August, was on rising British glam rock star Marc Bolan.

Roxon wrote a novel, loosely based on her years in Sydney, which was never published. This manuscript now resides in Sydney's Mitchell Library, State Library of New South Wales, along with her large collection of letters and other papers, donated by her family and her close friend, the film producer, Margaret Fink.

== Death ==
Roxon died at the age of 41 on 10 August 1973, after suffering a severe asthma attack in her New York apartment. Both parents predeceased her and she never married or had children. She was survived by two brothers Jack and Milo. Her niece, Nicola Roxon was the Attorney-General of Australia from 2012 to 2013.

Roxon Place, in the Canberra suburb of Gilmore with a tradition of street names honouring journalists, is named in her honour.

== Legacy ==
In August 2002, a biography of Roxon was published in Australia by Black Inc.: Lillian Roxon, Mother of Rock, written by the Sydney-based journalist and author Robert Milliken.

A documentary film entitled Mother of Rock: Lillian Roxon, written and directed by Paul Clarke, premiered at the 2010 Melbourne International Film Festival and was partly financed by the Festival's Premiere Fund.

In Lily Brett's 2012 novel Lola Bensky, based on Brett's own experience as a music journalist, Lola meets Lillian Roxon.

In the 2017 miniseries Friday On My Mind, the Easybeats travel to New York in 1967 and meet Roxon, portrayed by Ella Scott Lynch.

The 2019 film I Am Woman depicts Helen Reddy's friendship with Lillian Roxon, portrayed by Tilda Cobham-Hervey and Danielle Macdonald respectively.

The National Film and Sound Archive has a curated tribute to Roxon's life and work.

The Canadian poet Irving Layton wrote an elegy to Lillian Roxton in his collection The Pole Vaulter.
