= The Digger (Australian magazine) =

Australian alternative magazine (1972–1975)

The Digger was an alternative magazine published in Australia between August 1972 and December 1975. It was established by Phillip Frazer, Bruce Hanford, Ian McCausland, Jen Jewel Brown and Jon Hawkes. Notable contributors included Virginia Fraser, Ron Cobb, Bob Daly, Beatrice Faust, Ponch Hawkes, Helen Garner, Michael Leunig, Hall Greenland, Anne Summers, Wendy Bacon, Neil McLean, Patrick Cook and Phil Pinder. The paper had headquarters in Carlton, Victoria, and in Glebe, New South Wales

== Background ==
With Frazer as the common thread, The Digger was produced by a frequently changing collective—including Bruce Hanford, Helen Garner, Ponch Hawkes, Jenny (Jewel) Brown, Colin Talbot, Garrie Hutchinson, Virginia Fraser, Hall Greenland, Grant Evans, Kate Jennings, Isabelle Rosenberg, Sandra Zurbo, and Michael Zerman — until December 1975, when it folded under the weight of too little money and too many lawsuits: a libel suit from Builders Labourers union boss Norm Gallagher, another filed by the head of the South Australian Police, and an obscenity case brought by the State of Victoria for Helen Garner's article describing a sex-education class. Frazer left Australia for the United States in July 1976, and has been a publisher, editor, and writer in both countries ever since. Frazer's blog coorabellridge.com includes posts of articles and graphics from The Digger archive, and 100 commentaries he wrote in the Byron Echo on his return after 40 years in the US.

In October 1972 Helen Garner wrote (anonymously) an article for The Digger in which she chronicled a spontaneous sex education lesson she gave to her 13-year-old students while working as a teacher at Fitzroy High School. In the article, Garner said that she had intended to give a lesson on Ancient Greek art but the textbooks given to her students had been defaced with sexually explicit imagery. As a result of those images, the class posed questions relating to sex to Garner, who decided to allow an uninhibited discussion based on their questions, which she vowed to answer accurately.

When her identity was revealed, she was called into the Victorian Department of Education and fired on the spot. The case was widely publicised in Melbourne, bringing Garner a degree of notoriety. Her colleagues, along with members of the Victorian Secondary Teachers Association, went on strike in protest at the deputy director of Secondary Education's decision to fire Garner. As a result of her dismissal as a teacher, she began writing, first in The Digger and then in her cult classic novel Monkey Grip which established her writing career.
