= Rachel Zegler =

American actress and singer (born 2001)

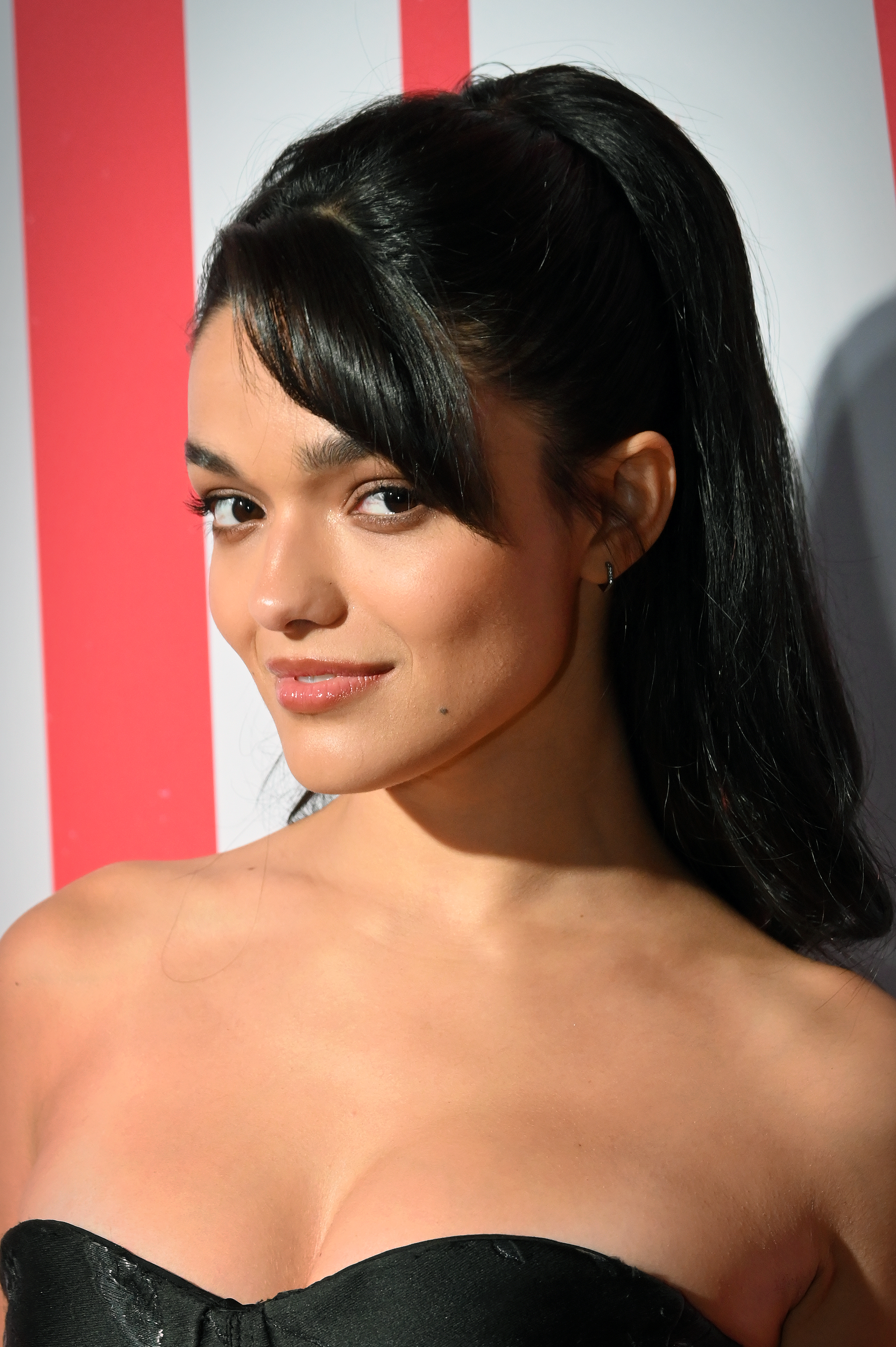
- Zegler in 2025
- Born: Rachel Anne Zegler; May 3, 2001 (age 25); Hackensack, New Jersey, U.S.
- Occupations: Actress; singer
- Years active: 2016–present

Signature
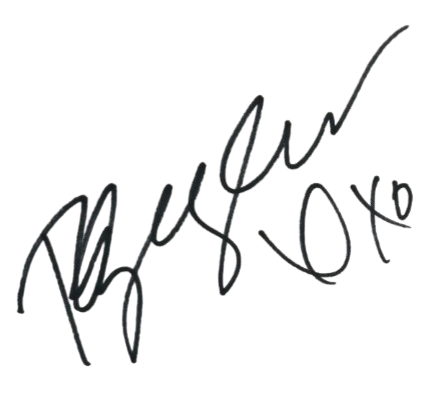

Rachel Anne Zegler (/ˈzɛɡlər/ born May 3, 2001) is an American actress and singer. Zegler gained recognition for her performance as María in Steven Spielberg's film adaptation of the musical West Side Story (2021), for which she earned the Golden Globe Award for Best Actress in a Motion Picture – Musical or Comedy.

She has since portrayed Anthea in the superhero action film Shazam! Fury of the Gods (2023), Lucy Gray Baird in the dystopian drama The Hunger Games: The Ballad of Songbirds & Snakes (2023), and the title character in the musical fantasy Snow White (2025).

Zegler made her Broadway debut playing Juliet in Romeo and Juliet (2024) and her West End debut as Eva Perón in the musical Evita (2025), for which she won the Laurence Olivier Award for Best Actress in a Musical.

== Early life and education ==
Rachel Anne Zegler was born in Hackensack, New Jersey, on May 3, 2001, to Craig and Gina Zegler. She was named after the fictional character Rachel Green from the TV series Friends. She has an older sister named Jacqueline. Her mother was born in the United States to Colombian immigrants and was raised partly in Barranquilla. Her father is of distant Polish descent.

Zegler grew up in Clifton, New Jersey. She recalls that, as a child, she faced racial discrimination on social media due to her Hispanic heritage, though she also said she experienced privilege as a lighter-skinned person of Latin American descent. Zegler became a fan of the theater after seeing her first Broadway show, Beauty and the Beast, at age four. Her first acting role came at age 12, playing Shprintze in a production of Fiddler on the Roof. She decided then that she wanted to be an actress and began taking voice and acting lessons.

Zegler attended the Catholic all-girls Immaculate Conception High School in Lodi, New Jersey, where she starred in several musicals, playing Belle in Beauty and the Beast (2016), Ariel in The Little Mermaid (2017), Dorothy Brock in 42nd Street (2018), and Princess Fiona in Shrek the Musical (2019). For all four performances, she received Metropolitan High School Theater Award nominations for the Actress in a Leading Role category. She graduated on June 2, 2019, as salutatorian. Her YouTube channel was active from July 2015 to August 2023 and garnered media coverage.

== Career ==
=== 2018–2021: West Side Story and breakthrough ===
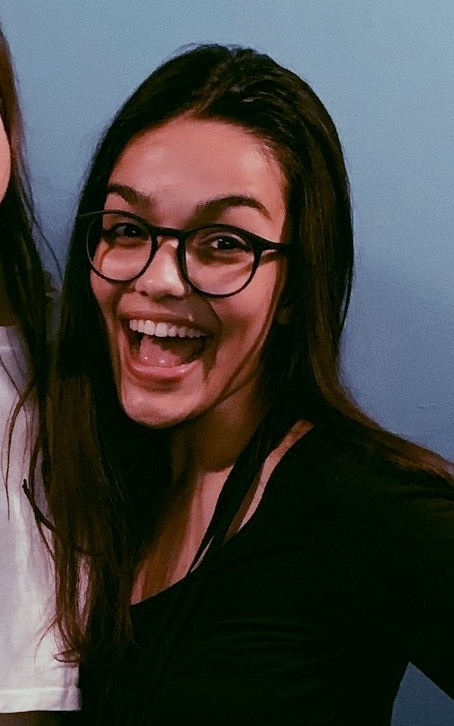
Zegler in 2019

In January 2018, director Steven Spielberg posted an open casting call via Twitter for a new film adaptation of West Side Story. Zegler, then 16 years old, responded with videos of herself singing "Tonight" and "I Feel Pretty"; she had performed the role of Maria at the Bergen Performing Arts Center in 2017. She was selected from more than 30,000 applicants for the role, marking her film debut. The film was released in December 2021, and earned acclaim from critics and audiences.

For her performance, Zegler received a Critics' Choice Movie Award nomination for Best Young Performer and won the Golden Globe Award for Best Actress – Motion Picture Musical or Comedy, She was the first actress of Colombian descent to win in that category and, at age 20, the youngest.

=== 2022–present: Franchise films; Broadway and West End debuts ===
Zegler starred as Anthea in the superhero film Shazam! Fury of the Gods (2023). The film received mixed reviews and was a box-office failure, grossing $134.1 million worldwide against a production budget of $110–125 million. She played protagonist Lucy Gray Baird in the 2023 film adaptation of the Hunger Games prequel The Hunger Games: The Ballad of Songbirds & Snakes. The film received mixed to positive reception. David Ehrlich of IndieWire praised Zegler, writing, "[She] is absolutely captivating in a Wild Rose-coded performance that's equal part Southern pluck and wide-eyed terror ... it is a marvel of multiplex acting. ... Zegler knows how to play nuance big enough for the back of the room to read it all over her face". The film grossed $349 million worldwide against a production budget of $100 million.

In 2023, Zegler announced her exit from Paddington in Peru, attributing her departure to the SAG strike. She played Laura in the film Y2K, which debuted at the South by Southwest Festival in 2024 and was released on December 6 that year to a mixed reception.

Zegler made her Broadway debut playing Juliet in a musical adaptation of William Shakespeare's Romeo and Juliet, directed by Sam Gold with music by Jack Antonoff, from September 26, 2024, to February 16, 2025. She voiced the lead character, Princess Ellian, in the animated musical film Spellbound (2024), which premiered on Netflix. She then played the titular character in Snow White (2025), a live-action adaptation of the 1937 animated Disney film. Prior to its release, the film drew criticism partly over a Latina actress being cast in the role, partly over Zegler's criticism of the original film and partly over co-star Gal Gadot's opposing views on the Israeli–Palestinian conflict, prompting boycott calls from both political sides. Amid the film's mixed reviews, critics praised Zegler's performance. It grossed approximately $206 million worldwide against its production budget of $240–270 million, making it one of Disney's most expensive films, but it became the most-watched film on Disney+.

Zegler made her West End debut playing Eva Perón in a revival of Evita in the summer of 2025 at the London Palladium, for which she received positive reviews and won the Laurence Olivier Award for Best Actress in a Musical. Zegler headlined two concerts at the London Palladium in October 2025, alongside special guests Ramin Karimloo and Andrew Lloyd Webber (the latter appeared only at the evening performance). She played Cathy Hiatt for a one-week engagement in March 2026 in a concert production of The Last Five Years opposite Ben Platt at the Palladium to celebrate the musical's 25th anniversary, recording a live album of their performance. Platt and Zegler reprised these roles at the Hollywood Bowl and at Radio City Music Hall in April 2026, where one critic wrote: "Zegler leans into [Cathy's] complexity with focus and control, delivering each moment with precision while allowing the emotional unraveling to reveal itself gradually. Zegler performed at the 2026 Tony Awards. She participated in the 30th anniversary concert of Rent, on October 26, 2026, at Broadway's Richard Rodgers Theatre, to benefit Broadway Cares/Equity Fights AIDS; it was livestreamed and recorded.

==== Upcoming projects ====
Zegler is set to star alongside Marisa Tomei in the comedy drama film She Gets It from Me. Zegler is also set to star as Velma in the Lin-Manuel Miranda-directed movie Octet, based on the musical, as Emma in the film Last Dance, and Dana in the psychological thriller NDA. From January 5–17, 2027, she plans to give a short concert residency at @sohoplace, a West End theatre. She is expected to star in Evita upon its transfer to Broadway at the Winter Garden Theatre with previews set to begin in February 2027.

== Public image ==
Zegler is included in the Forbes 30 Under 30 class of 2022 list. She was named one of Time magazine's Latino leaders.

Also in 2022, Zegler garnered online backlash for a since-deleted video in which she gave a dramatic reading of Britney Spears's Twitter messages online to her sister, Jamie Lynn Spears. She later apologized on the platform, writing: "While I meant no disrespect whatsoever, I should have thought about how this could be perceived, and I'm so sorry for upsetting or disappointing anyone. This is not a situation to be taken lightly, and we should all be lifting Britney up in this pivotal time."

She was initially not invited to attend the 94th Academy Awards ceremony of 2022 where West Side Story received seven nominations, including Best Picture, but Zegler was not nominated. After media comment over the perceived snub, the Academy invited her to be a presenter.

== Personal life ==
In February 2021, Zegler and actor Josh Andrés Rivera confirmed that they were dating. The two met on the set of West Side Story and later both appeared in The Hunger Games: The Ballad of Songbirds and Snakes. The relationship ended in 2024.

Zegler cites Barbra Streisand as one of her primary influences. In 2021, Streisand sent Zegler a copy of her album Release Me 2 and a copy of the book Streisand From A to Z.

Zegler has stated that she struggles with anxiety and attends psychiatric sessions. She experienced a breast cancer scare as a teenager.

== Political views ==
She has publicly supported Palestine in the Israeli–Palestinian conflict since 2021. In October 2023, Zegler joined Artists4Ceasefire and signed a letter urging Joe Biden to call for a ceasefire during the war. In January 2024, she encouraged her followers on Instagram to pressure government leaders for a ceasefire. In August 2024, she tweeted, "and always remember, Free Palestine". Snow White producer Marc Platt voiced concerns about Zegler's Israeli co-star Gal Gadot receiving death threats, which they attributed to Zegler's post. This led Disney to provide additional security for Gadot. After the film's release, Platt's son Jonah confirmed that his father had flown to New York to reprimand Zegler for her remarks.

In November 2024, Zegler criticized Donald Trump and his supporters, claiming there is a "deep, deep sickness" in the United States and accusing Trump of "threaten[ing] our democracy". She also wrote, "May Trump supporters and Trump voters and Trump himself never know peace." She later apologized for "contribut[ing] to the negative discourse".

== Acting credits ==
=== Film ===
Year	Title	Role	Notes	Ref.
2021	West Side Story	María		
2023	Shazam! Fury of the Gods	Anthea / Anne		
2023	The Hunger Games: The Ballad of Songbirds & Snakes	Lucy Gray Baird		
2024	Y2K	Laura		
2024	Spellbound	Princess Ellian	Voice role	
2025	Snow White	Snow White		
TBA	She Gets It from Me †	Nicky Jannis	Completed	
TBA	Octet †	Velma	Post-production	
TBA	NDA †	Dana	Post-production	
TBA	Last Dance †	Emma	Filming	

=== Theatre ===
Year	Title	Role	Venue	Ref.
2024–2025	Romeo + Juliet	Juliet Capulet	Circle in the Square Theatre, Broadway	
2025; upcoming	Evita	Eva Perón	London Palladium, West End	
2025; upcoming	Evita	Eva Perón	Winter Garden Theatre, Broadway (upcoming)	
2026	The Last Five Years	Cathy Hiatt	London Palladium, West End	
2026	The Last Five Years	Cathy Hiatt	Hollywood Bowl & Radio City Music Hall	

=== Podcast ===
Year	Title	Role	Notes
2021	Princess of South Beach	Maria Del Carmen / Gloria Calderon	Main role

== Discography ==
=== Cast albums ===
Album	Year
Evita (2025 London Palladium Cast- 10 Track Version)	2026
The Last Five Years (25th Anniversary Live at the London Palladium)	2026
Evita: The Full Album (2026)	2026

=== Soundtrack appearances ===
Album	Year
West Side Story (2021 soundtrack)	2021
The Hunger Games: The Ballad of Songbirds & Snakes (soundtrack)	2023
Spellbound (soundtrack)	2024
Snow White (2025 soundtrack)	2025

=== Singles ===
List of singles, with selected chart positions
Title	Year	Peak chart positions		Album
Title	Year	NZ Hot	UK Sales	Album
"Let Me Try"	2021	—	—	Non-album single
"Balcony Scene (Tonight)" (with Ansel Elgort)	2021	—	—	West Side Story
"The Hanging Tree"	2023	19	—	The Hunger Games: The Ballad of Songbirds & Snakes
"The Ballad of Lucy Gray Baird"	2023	12	—	The Hunger Games: The Ballad of Songbirds & Snakes
"Man of the House"	2024	—	—	Romeo + Juliet
"Waiting on a Wish"	2025	—	74	Disney's Snow White
"Don't Cry for Me Argentina"	2025	—	15	Evita
"Don't Cry for Me Argentina: Studio Version"	2025			Evita
"Don't Cry for Me Argentina New Miami Mix"	2025			Evita
"Rainbow High"	2025	—	57	Evita
"Rainbow Tour"	2026			Evita

=== Other charted songs ===
List of other charted songs, with selected chart positions
Title	Year	Peak chart positions	Album
Title	Year	NZ Hot	Album
"Nothing You Can Take from Me (Boot-Stompin' Version)" (with the Covey Band)	2023	13	The Hunger Games: The Ballad of Songbirds & Snakes
"Pure as the Driven Snow" (with the Covey Band)	2023	22	The Hunger Games: The Ballad of Songbirds & Snakes

=== Other appearances ===
List of other appearances
Title	Year	Other artist(s)	Album
"Days from Long Ago"	2021	Alejandro Rodriguez, Anna Ebbeson, Shakina Nayfack, Solea Pfeiffer	#IWriteMusicals: Musical Theater Songwriting Challenge (the 2020 edition)
"Your World / Safe"	2021	Alexia Sielo, Anna Ebbeson, Anna Jacobs, Henry Crater, Jared Goldsmith, Jason Gotay, Nick Cartell	#IWriteMusicals: Musical Theater Songwriting Challenge (the 2020 edition)
"Rey's Theme"	2021	None	The George Lucas Talk Show Original Livestream Series Soundtrack
"Mile Away"	2023	George Watsky	Intention
"One More Day"	2024	George Watsky	One More Day - Single

== Accolades ==
List of awards and nominations received by Rachel Zegler
Year	Award	Category	Work	Result	Ref.
2021	Chicago Film Critics Association	Most Promising Performer	West Side Story	Nominated	
2021	Florida Film Critics Circle	Pauline Kael Breakout Award	West Side Story	Runner-up	
2021	National Board of Review	Best Actress	West Side Story	Won	
2021	Washington D.C. Area Film Critics Association	Best Youth Performance	West Side Story	Nominated	
2022	Alliance of Women Film Journalists	Best Breakthrough Performance	West Side Story	Nominated	
2022	Critics' Choice Movie Awards	Best Young Actor/Actress	West Side Story	Nominated	
2022	Dorian Awards	Rising Star of the Year	West Side Story	Nominated	
2022	Imagen Awards	Best Actress	West Side Story	Nominated	
2022	Georgia Film Critics Association	Best Actress	West Side Story	Nominated	
2022	Georgia Film Critics Association	Breakthrough Award	West Side Story	Nominated	
2022	Golden Globe Awards	Best Actress in a Motion Picture – Musical or Comedy	West Side Story	Won	
2024	People's Choice Awards	Action Movie Star of the Year	The Hunger Games: The Ballad of Songbirds & Snakes	Won	
2024	People's Choice Awards	Female Movie Star of the Year	The Hunger Games: The Ballad of Songbirds & Snakes	Nominated	
2025	Saturn Awards	Best Performance by a Younger Actor	The Hunger Games: The Ballad of Songbirds & Snakes	Nominated	
2025	iHeartRadio Music Awards	Favorite Broadway Debut	Romeo + Juliet	Won	
2025	The Stage Debut Awards	Best West End Debut Performance	Evita	Won	
2026	Critics' Circle Theatre Awards	Best Actress	Evita	Nominated	
2026	Laurence Olivier Awards	Best Actress in a Musical	Evita	Won	
2026	Standard Theatre Awards	Best Musical Performance	Evita	Won	
2026	WhatsOnStage Awards	Best Performer in a Musical	Evita	Won	
2026	WhatsOnStage Awards	Best Concert Event	Rachel Zegler: Live at the London Palladium	Won	
