= She Gets It from Me =

Upcoming film by Julia von Heinz

- Directed by: Julia von Heinz
- Written by: Jay Reiss
- Produced by: Anna Werner; Jay Reiss
- Starring: Rachel Zegler; Marisa Tomei; Ed Helms; Nat Wolff
- Cinematography: Radium Cheung
- Edited by: Kathryn J. Schubert
- Music by: Kubilay Uner
- Production companies: 3311 Productions; Seven Elephant
- Country: United States
- Language: English

She Gets It From Me is an upcoming American comedy drama film directed by Julia von Heinz and written by Jay Reiss.

== Premise ==
A woman's engagement party is derailed when she has to go and look for her drug addicted musician mother.

== Cast ==
- Rachel Zegler as Nicky Jannis
- Marisa Tomei as Charlotte Wolfe
- Ed Helms
- Nat Wolff
- Landon Wilson as Flower Boy

== Production ==
It was announced in April 2025 that Rachel Zegler and Marisa Tomei were cast to star in the film, with Julia von Heinz set to direct. In February 2026, Ed Helms and Nat Wolff were added to the cast.

Principal photography began on February 23, 2026 in New Jersey. Production is also expected to take place in Germany. Scenes were shot in Cranford, New Jersey in March. Production wrapped in New York in July.
