= Margaret Jones (journalist) =

Australian journalist

- Born: 8 October 1923; Rockhampton, Queensland
- Died: 30 July 2006 (aged 82); Bondi, New South Wales
- Occupation: Journalist

Margaret Mary Jones (8 October 1923 – 30 July 2006) was an Australian journalist, noted for being one of the first accredited to China after the Cultural Revolution, and first female Foreign Editor on any Australian newspaper. Described as a "trailblazer for women journalists", she wrote for John Fairfax Limited for a total of thirty-three years.

== Early life and education ==
Jones was born in Rockhampton, Queensland,. She was the youngest of six children of John Jones, an employee of the Rockhampton Harbour Board for around 40 years. After a Catholic education in Rockhampton, she commenced teacher training in Brisbane, but abandoned it for life as a cadet journalist. There is an anecdote about her having a youthful article accepted by The Times in London.

== Career ==
She worked for the Australian Broadcasting Commission as a stringer, and was a regional correspondent on the Mackay Mercury from 1948 to 1953. She then moved to Sydney to work for the Daily Mirror.

She joined the Sydney Sun-Herald in 1954. Famously, her job application read in part "As you may see by my signature, I am a woman and I know that, even yet, a certain amount of prejudice still exists against women in journalism". Her first assignments were book and theatre reviews and a column "Dog of the Week".

She resigned in 1956 to work in England and Paris, then rejoined the Sun-Herald in 1961.

She was posted to New York City in 1965 as foreign correspondent for the Sydney Morning Herald, (Note: Confusingly to people from outside New South Wales, the Sydney Morning Herald is frequently referred to as simply The Herald, which was also the name of an unrelated Victorian newspaper (since 1990 absorbed into The Herald Sun).) the more serious broadsheet sister of the tabloid Sun-Herald, to share offices with the rock music journalist Lillian Roxon. Their relationship, noted Robert Milliken in his autobiography, was "like two sopranos sharing the same stage". Perhaps to keep the two apart, the editor John Pringle posted her in 1966 to Washington; she was the first Herald correspondent there. She experienced overt professional sex discrimination from the National Press Club, which did not admit woman members, effectively barring her from important presentations. Nevertheless, she made the most of her opportunities, reporting on President Lyndon B. Johnson and the escalation of the Vietnam War and the 1967 Glassboro Summit Conference between Johnson and Soviet Premier Alexei Kosygin.

She was posted to London in 1969, reporting on subjects as varied as the IRA and The Beatles. Returning to Australia in 1972 to become Literary Editor, she fought, successfully, to allow women full membership of the Sydney Journalists' Club.

With the Whitlam government's normalisation of relations with China, the foreign editor, Stephen Claypole, had Jones open a bureau for John Fairfax Ltd. in Peking (now Beijing) in 1973, despite her having no knowledge of Mandarin. Journalists then were prohibited from talking to ordinary Chinese people and had to rely on the official news agency and the Communist Party controlled newspapers Renmin Ribao and Kwangming Ribao. She was the first Herald journalist to be stationed there since World War II. She travelled extensively, to North Korea and from Yunan (now Yunnan Province) to Manchuria and Inner Mongolia. For six months, Western journalists suffered official restrictions in reaction to the release of Chung Kuo, Cina, Michelangelo Antonioni's documentary on China.

She returned to Australia to take up an appointment as Literary Editor, but regretted not being in China to witness the death of Mao Zedong, the rise and fall of the Gang of Four and the end of the Cultural Revolution. In 1976, she was invited by the Sydney Journalists' Club and the New South Wales branch of the Australian Journalists' Association to give the Paton-Wilkie-Deamer Newspaper Address, the first woman journalist to be so honoured.

In 1980, the early days of Margaret Thatcher's time as prime minister, she returned to London as European Correspondent. She later published an account of that time, Thatcher's Kingdom. On revisiting China in 1986, she noted the opening up of the country to tourists, and the greater ability to meet ordinary Chinese people.

Jones retired in 1987 and served on the Australian Press Council from 1988 to 1998. In 1991 she was appointed to the Independent Complaints Review Panel set up by John Howard to hear complaints about the ABC.

Among her other interests were membership (and a stint as vice-president) of Sydney PEN, where she was chair of the Writers in Prison Committee. She was an active member of the Australian Republic Movement, the Sydney Institute, the Mitchell Library's Library Society and the D H Lawrence Society, where she was secretary and a frequent contributor to their magazine Rananim.

She died in the Sydney coastal suburb of Bondi in July 2006 and was privately cremated; a week later a wake was held for her friends and colleagues. She had no surviving close relatives apart from one niece.

== Legacy ==
Jones' professionalism and refusal to be sidelined did much to overcome prejudice against female journalists, and the current improvement in gender balance can in some way be attributed to her.

She left a substantial part of her estate to the Mitchell Library and to the Art Gallery of New South Wales.

== Bibliography ==
- The Confucius Enigma, McGraw-Hill, Sydney, 1979
- Thatcher's Kingdom: A View of Britain in the Eighties, Collins, Sydney, 1984
- The Smiling Buddha, Hamilton, London, 1985 ISBN 978-0-9750860-8-7

== Sources ==
- "A trailblazer for women journalists". The Sydney Morning Herald. Fairfax Media. 3 August 2006. Archived from the original on 4 November 2012.
- "Margaret Jones, 1923-2006". Sydney PEN. Archived from the original on 19 September 2006.
- "The Smiling Buddha". University of Sydney. Archived from the original on 12 November 2009.
- "THE SYDNEY INSTITUTE ANNUAL DINNER LECTURE" (PDF). August 2006. pp. 35–36. Archived from the original (PDF) on 11 September 2009.
- E H Wilde, Joy Hooton and Barry Andrews (1994). The Oxford Companion to Australian Literature (2 ed.). Oxford University Press.
