= Rolling Stone Australia / New Zealand =

Australian–New Zealand edition of Rolling Stone magazine

Rolling Stone AU/NZ

- March 2025 cover, featuring Amyl and the Sniffers
- Editor-in-Chief: Neil Griffiths
- Former editors: James Jennings; Jake Challenor; Poppy Reid; Tyler Jenke; Rod Yates; Mat Coyte; Dan Lander; Simon Wooldridge; Rachel Newman; Elissa Blake; Andrew Humphries; Kathy Bail; Toby Creswell; Paul Gardiner; Jane Mathieson; Phillip Frazer/Alistair Jones
- Categories: Music magazine
- Frequency: Quarterly
- Circulation: 180,000
- First issue: January 1972
- Company: Vinyl Group
- Country: Australia
- Based in: Sydney
- Website: au.rollingstone.com nz.rollingstone.com
- ISSN: 1320-0615 (print); 3066-0580 (web)

Rolling Stone Australia / New Zealand is the Australian and New Zealand edition of the United States' Rolling Stone magazine devoted to music, politics, and popular culture, published monthly. The Australian version of Rolling Stone was initially published in 1970 as a supplement in Revolution magazine published by Monash University student Phillip Frazer. It was launched as a fully fledged magazine in 1972 by Frazer and was the longest-surviving international edition of Rolling Stone until its last issue appeared in January 2018.

As of November 2019, Rolling Stone Australia returned with a physical and digital platform published by The Brag Media, now as Vinyl Media, in an exclusive licensing deal with Rolling Stone owner Penske Media Corporation.

In 2022, The Brag expanded to New Zealand and rebranded the magazine as Rolling Stone Australia / New Zealand. Although separate websites were set up for Australia and New Zealand, the print publication is identical for both countries.

== History ==
The Australian version of Rolling Stone launched in May 1970 as a supplement in Revolution, a counter-culture magazine edited and published by Phillip Frazer in Melbourne as an offshoot of his teen-based pop newspaper Go-Set. Go-Set introduced a counter-culture supplement called Core on 13 December 1969, edited by Ed Nimmervoll who had worked on Go-Set since 1966. Frazer soon decided that the "Core" material deserved a stand-alone publication for older readers, and on 1 May 1970, Go-Set Publications launched the tabloid Revolution, co-edited by Frazer and Jon Hawkes. From its fourth issue onward Revolution included a supplement of Rolling Stone pages under an agreement Frazer made with its Californian owner and publisher Jann Wenner. In August 1971 Revolution became High Times(before the US magazine of that name), which featured Australian underground cartoons curated by co-editors Pat Woolley and Macy McFarland. Frazer left Go-Set and High Times early in 1972 and, with his business partner Geoff Watson, launched the Australian Rolling Stone as a fully fledged magazine, five years after the flagship started in the United States. Rolling Stone Australia was published fortnightly, devoted to music, politics, and popular culture, with a few local articles supplementing the major features from the parent magazine. In August 1972 Frazer launched an Australian counter-culture magazine The Digger which was published fortnightly, then monthly, and it was The Digger, and not the local edition Rolling Stone, that fostered a team of star young writers like Colin Talbot, Helen Garner, Garrie Hutchinson and Robert Adamson, who rivalled the American Rolling Stone’s iconoclastic reputation for New Journalism.

The first edition [of Rolling Stone] I saw was just so quirky. It was basically a tabloid format, A3-sized, folded so that it looked the size of an A4 page. It was on newsprint and because it was folded you could have the huge image on the front cover. It was very simple, it was just the essence of hipness

— Bruce Elder, 12 April 2002

In 1975, before Frazer left Australia for the United States, he closed down The Digger and sold the local Rolling Stone licence to a group of journalists led by former Financial Review writer Paul Gardiner, with Jane Mathieson and Paul Comrie Thomson. One thing this meant, perhaps most crucially, was that the magazine moved base from Melbourne to Sydney. The first Australian act on the cover was Skyhooks in 1976, who reportedly hated the photo, but it did mark a broadening recognition of local acts in the magazine. Together Gardiner, Mathieson and Comrie-Thompson built Rolling Stone Australia up as a major player in terms of circulation, shifting about 35,000 copies each fortnight. The magazine, however, lacked consistent local content. The Skyhooks cover was the exception rather than the rule, and an Australian band would not re-appear on the cover again until Men at Work in 1983 – and that was a relayed American story. The magazine also lacked the immediacy and the team of quality contributors that made its rival RAM so much more successful in terms of relevance and quality. Certainly in no way in this phase, in the late 70s, did it develop a cast of writers the way The Digger had only a few years earlier, with only Bruce Elder staying on for the long haul, and P.D. Jack coming and going.

As the booms in local pub rock and punk rock started to take off, Rolling Stone seemed increasingly irrelevant, an imported acolyte of all things West Coast with precious little acknowledgement of the blossoming Australian scene around it. The real mark of the magazine's change came in 1980, when it shifted from a fortnightly to a monthly. Paul Gardiner partnered with art director Andrew Penhallow and founded GAP Records, which quickly acquired the local licences for UK labels Rough Trade and Factory Records, as well as signing local acts (such as Pel Mel) – meaning that in addition to Rolling Stone the office was now putting out albums by Joy Division and Cabaret Voltaire. At the same time Paul Comrie-Thompson became a sort of advisor if not manager to Chris Bailey and his band the Saints. A handful of younger writers like Ed St.John and occasional RAM contributors Toby Creswell and Clinton Walker too started freelancing for Rolling Stone and invigorating its pages.

The magazine shifted from its old office in North Sydney to the basement of the Gardiners’ home in Neutral Bay, and even as it continued to tinker, in the mid-80s, with its format, experimenting with design styles, colour and paperstock – and experimenting with a great many different contributors – it was finally starting to look like a viable competitor to RAM. In 1985, Rolling Stone published The Big Australian Rock Book, a sort of A-Z survey of then-Australian music, edited by Ed St.John and written largely by him, Bruce Elder, Toby Creswell, Clinton Walker and Andrea Jones.

In 1986, Toby Creswell became editor after Ed St. John left to work as a record company executive. Creswell, a journalist familiar with the Rolling Stone approach, focused on Australian music, shaping the magazine's local coverage in the late 1980s and early 1990s. While still using content from its American parent publication, the magazine included features, news stories, and reviews, with Clinton Walker as a frequent contributor alongside Creswell.

In 1987, owners Paul Gardiner and Jane Maitheson pulled out of the business amid mounting debts and American indifference, and the licence to publish Rolling Stone in Australia was picked up by Creswell leading a consortium he'd assembled with an old school friend, Philip Keir, and Keir's wife Lesa-Belle Furhagen. Shifting headquarters back to Sydney city, to Surry Hills right in the middle of a booming inner-city music circuit, and taking on staff that included most notably designer/writer David Messer, Rolling Stone was then left, after the demise of RAM in 1989, with the Australian music magazine market almost entirely to itself. In the face of competition only from the now-widespread, regionalised free street press with its preponderance of advertorial, and now with John O’Donnell as Creswell's Assistant Editor and going glossy full colour throughout, Rolling Stone entered its peak period, with its own flavor quite distinct from the American edition. In addition to relying on Clinton Walker for major features and acerbic reviews, Creswell nurtured new young writers like O’Donnell and John Birmingham, who won Rolling Stone’s campus writing contest, and had it not been for its great weakness, its Sydney-centricity – its inability to get good consistent coverage on the ground in Melbourne – the magazine would undoubtedly have been Australia's journal of record for music culture.

By the early 90s, however, with Next Media now having bought a building of its own in southern-Sydney suburb Redfern, tensions were brewing between Phil Keir and both his wife Lesa-Belle Furhagen and Toby Creswell. The eventual result was that September 1992, saw a traumatic split, in which Creswell was escorted off the premises by security, Keir took control of the company, and Creswell and Furhagen went off together to form Terraplane Press, which launched Juice magazine.

Juice aimed itself, with the rise of grunge in the 90s, at a slightly younger demographic than Rolling Stone, but Rolling Stone, with Kathy Bail now installed as editor, continued to offer quality coverage of Australian and global music, politics, and popular culture. Freelancer Clinton Walker was the only writer to carry over from the old regime to this new one (while he also contributed to Juice at the same time!), and when Dino Scatena came in on staff to assist Bail, the magazine enjoyed a boost in stability and success, and certainly it would outlive Juice, which despite its efforts for a decade, went down when the dot.com bubble burst in 2003.

Australian Rolling Stone celebrated its 25th year with a special collector's edition in May 1998, and at that time the publishers claimed the current circulation was around 40,000.

After Bail and Scatena (and Clinton Walker) had left the magazine by the late 1990s, it entered into something of a phase in the wilderness, with a succession of editors and owners compromising its content and integrity in the face of a shifting pop-cultural landscape, including not least of all the rise of the internet.

In 2008 Next Media Pty Ltd was purchased by Worseley Media, in a deal that saw ACP Magazines acquire Rolling Stone magazine in exchange for ACP titles Tracks and Waves. A few months later, ACP relaunched Rolling Stone, with a new look and size.

Year after year, Rolling Stone Australia has made me proud. They have executed the Rolling Stone mission with style, intelligence and energy. My hat is off to everyone who has contributed to this success over the years and I look forward to even greater years to come.

— Jann Wenner, 2009

In 2008 the magazine averaged sales of 27,051 copies a month, down from 29,372 the year before and about 40,000 at the time of its 30th anniversary issue six years previous. Its average readership in March 2008 was 301,000, compared with 296,000 a year earlier; the readership had peaked in December 1994 at 392,000.

ACP was acquired by Bauer Media Group in 2012 and in 2013, the company Paper Riot, headed by Matt Coyte, bought the Rolling Stone franchise from Bauer. Under Coyte's editorship, and with the launch of its own independent website in 2014, Rolling Stone started to claw back some of its former relevance and credibility, but it was an Indian Summer, and in January 2018, Paper Riot went into external administration and the last issue of Australian Rolling Stone appeared.

In January 2019, it was announced that Rolling Stone would be returning to the Australian market. In November 2019, it was announced that Penske Media had entered into a multi-year licensing agreement with Australian music publisher, The Brag Media, to relaunch the local physical and digital edition of Rolling Stone. The license was renewed in 2025 by Vinyl Group publishing arm, Vinyl Media. The magazine was renamed to Rolling Stone Australia / New Zealand in 2022 and distributed in both countries.

The print magazine was published quarterly until in late-2025 when they announced that while Rolling Stone Australia / New Zealand would still publish four issues each year, they would no longer arrive at a fixed quarterly schedule.

== Awards ==
Commencing in 2010, the Rolling Stone Australia Awards are awarded annually in January by Rolling Stone Australia for outstanding contributions to popular culture in the previous year. They initially ran from 2009 to 2015 and have been relaunched as of March 2021.
