= Treasure (2024 German-French film) =

2024 German-French film directed by Julia von Heinz

- Promotional poster
- Directed by: Julia von Heinz
- Written by: Julia von Heinz; John Quester
- Based on: Too Many Men by Lily Brett
- Produced by: Fabian Gasmia; Julia von Heinz; Lena Dunham
- Starring: Lena Dunham; Stephen Fry; Zbigniew Zamachowski
- Cinematography: Daniela Knapp
- Edited by: Sandie Bompar
- Music by: Antoni Komasa-Łazarkiewicz; Mary Komasa-Łazarkiewicz
- Production companies: Seven Elephants GmbH; Good Thing Going; Haïku Films
- Distributed by: Alamode Film (Germany); Haut et Court (France)
- Release date: 17 February 2024 (Berlinale)
- Running time: 112 minutes
- Countries: Germany; France
- Language: English
- Box office: $1.7 million

Treasure is a 2024 tragicomedy film directed by Julia von Heinz. Based on the 1999 novel Too Many Men by Lily Brett, the film stars Lena Dunham, Stephen Fry and Zbigniew Zamachowski. It’s the story of Ruth, (Lena Dunham), a young New York woman who, shortly after the collapse of the Iron Curtain, accompanies her father Edek (Stephen Fry) to Poland for a tour of his childhood home, the remnants of the family’s business, and the concentration camp at Auschwitz, which he miraculously survived while the rest of his large Jewish family perished. Edek uses his fluency in Polish to appear acclimated, and befriends anyone along the way. This zest for life camouflages a deep distrust for Polish people and his wariness over digging into the past so Ruth does not become another deceased loved one, which is not an irrational fear after the Kielce Pogrom in July 1946, which is explicitly referenced.

It was selected in the Berlinale Special Gala section at the 74th Berlin International Film Festival and was screened on 17 February 2024. The film was released in the United States on June 14, 2024 by Bleecker Street in co-partnership with FilmNation Entertainment. Among verified audience members, the film has an approval rating of 91%, with an average rating of 4.3/5.

== Cast ==
- Lena Dunham as Ruth
- Stephen Fry as Edek
- Zbigniew Zamachowski as Stefan
- Petra Zieser as German Woman
- Robert Besta as Hotel Manager
- Oliver Ewy as Witek
- David Krzysteczko as Michal
- Monika Obmalko as Managerin
- Dennis Papst as Hotelgast
- Anya Leonhard as Hotelgast
- Yuval Gal Cohen as Hotelgast

== Production ==
Initially titled Iron Box, the film is directed by Julia von Heinz, who also wrote the screenplay with John Quester, and is produced by Seven Elephants and Good Thing Going.

The film was shot from 21 February 2023 to 7 May 2023 in Germany at Berlin, Saxony-Anhalt, Thuringia, and in Poland. 18 of the 39 days of filming took place in central Germany in spring 2023. The main filming location in the region was Halle (Saale).

== Release ==
Treasure had its world premiere on 17 February 2024, as part of the 74th Berlin International Film Festival, in Berlin Special Gala. Prior to its world premiere, FilmNation Entertainment and Bleecker Street acquired worldwide distribution rights to the film in January 2024.

The film was released on 14 June 2024 theatrically by Bleecker Street.

The film was selected in the Special Presentations at the 2024 Cinéfest Sudbury International Film Festival to be held from September 14 to 22, 2024 in Sudbury, Ontario.

== Reception ==
On the review aggregator Rotten Tomatoes, the film has an approval rating by critics of 42% based on 57 reviews, with an average rating of 5.3/10. The website's consensus reads: "While Stephen Fry and Lena Dunham provide some affecting moments as a father-daughter pair, Treasure's dramatic riches mostly remain buried." Among verified audience members, though, the film has an approval rating of 91%, with an average rating of 4.3/5.

Ben Roll of TheWrap wrote that "...“Treasure” pulls at the impossible understanding between a generation of survivors and the children they reared – kin separated by incompatible visions and experiences of the world, casting orphans against progeny raised in quiet grief while spared from similar heartbreak."

David Erhlich of IndieWire gave the film a B−, and wrote: "Adapted from Lily Brett’s autobiographical 1999 novel “Too Many Men,” “Treasure” is essentially an intergenerational story about the walls that people build in order to protect themselves and each other. More specifically, it’s a story about what happens when those walls grow so tall they threaten to block out our loved ones on the other side, and the difficult process that’s required to dismantle them before it’s too late."

Alex Godfrey of Empire rated the film 3/5, and wrote: "Director Julia von Heinz takes on a lot here, wrangling a lightly comedic father-daughter road-trip buddy-movie out of her adaptation of a 542-page book, unpacking generational trauma, the legacy of Auschwitz and institutionalised antisemitism."

Tim Robey of The Daily Telegraph rated the film 2/5, and wrote: "Sombre, sluggish and usually on the right side of respectable, Julia von Heinz’s film eventually bottles its task, coming to mollifying conclusions about the 20th century’s starkest horrors."

Leslie Felperin, reviewing the film for The Hollywood Reporter, dubbed it as "Oy gevalt!", and opined: "So muddled and misbegotten it’s hard to perform an evidential postmortem, based strictly on one viewing, of where it all goes wrong."

Wendy Ide reviewing the film at the Berlinale, wrote in ScreenDaily: "Treasure is a curiously inert work, a film that feels as emotionally grey and underlit as its cinematography."

Ben Rolph in AwardsWatch graded the film C, and wrote: "Dunham’s connection to the story cannot save her stilted line delivery, every word feels forced as if just read off the page giving a frustrating lack of authenticity in her performance."
