= Things Could Be Worse =

1990 novel by Australian author Lily Brett

Things Could be Worse
- First edition
- Author: Lily Brett
- Language: English
- Genre: Autobiographical novel
- Publisher: Meanjin
- Publication date: 1990
- Publication place: United States
- Media type: Print (hardback & paperback)

Things Could be Worse is an autobiographical novel by Lily Brett about a family of Polish Jews who found refuge in Melbourne in the late 1940s, hoping to move past their trauma and build a normal life.

== Plot summary ==
Renia and Josl Bensky grow up in the Polish town of Łódź, Poland. Shortly after their marriage, they are forced to move to the Ghetto of Łódź, and soon, they are deported to the concentration camp of Auschwitz. After the downfall of the Third Reich, they meet again, and their first daughter Lola is born in a DP camp in 1946.

In 1948, The Benskys move to Melbourne to start a new life, far from the atrocities they endured during the Holocaust. They make friends with fellow Jewish Immigrants.

Josl and Renia both try to live with their past; in this mixture of trying to forget and to commemorate, they raise Lola to be an Australian girl. Lola knows she will never understand her parents completely since she will never experience what they had to live through. She has her own problems. She has overweight, weird boyfriends and a first husband whom she does not love.

When she turns 19, Lola starts to write for a rock magazine and gets to travel around the world to interview the stars of her time. Apart from her job, she raises her children and tries to figure out her life. Finally, she marries the artist Garth and moves to New York.
