= Dore Ashton =

American art historian

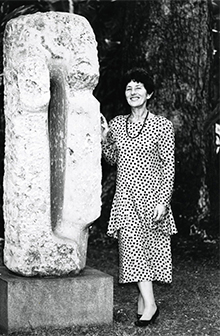
Ashton c. 1963

Dore Ashton (May 21, 1928 – January 30, 2017) was an American writer, professor and critic on modern and contemporary art.

== Biography ==
Ashton was born in Newark, New Jersey, on May 21, 1928. She was the author or editor of more than thirty books on art, including Noguchi East and West, About Rothko, American Art Since 1945, The New York School: A Cultural Reckoning and Picasso On Art. Ashton also contributed to many publications, including Art Digest. and worked as an art critic at The New York Times. Ashton was one of the New York art critics who championed the New York School, along with Harold Rosenberg and Barbara Rose. Ashton's 1983 work on Mark Rothko, About Rothko, remains a source of much discussion about the artist. Ashton's last book, David Rankin: The New York Years, on artist David Rankin was published in 2013.

Ashton was a professor of art history at the Cooper Union in New York City and a senior critic in painting and printmaking at Yale. Ashton received a bachelor's degree in literature from the University of Wisconsin and an M.A. in art history from Harvard University.

Ashton died on January 30, 2017, at the age of 88 in the Bronx, New York City, New York.

== Awards and honors ==
Ashton received numerous awards, including Guggenheim Foundation Fellowships in 1963 and 1969, the Frank J. Mather Award for art criticism from the College Art Association in 1963 and a Ford Foundation Award in 1965.

== Bibliography ==
- The Unknown Shore: A View of Contemporary Art. Little, Brown, 1962.
- A Reading of Modern Art. Case Western Reserve University Press, 1970.
- The New York School: A Cultural Reckoning. University of California Press, 1973.
- A Joseph Cornell Album. Viking Press, 1974.
- Rosa Bonheur: A Life and a Legend. The Viking Press, 1981.
- Abstract Expressionist Painting in America. Harvard University Press, 1983.
- Out of the Whirlwind: Three Decades of Arts Commentary. UMI Research Press, 1987.
- Picasso on Art: A Selection of Views. Da Capo Press, 1972.
- Yes, But… A Critical Study of Philip Guston. The Viking Press, 1976.
- A Fable of Modern Art. Thames and Hudson Inc., 1980.
- Noguchi East and West. University of California Press, 1993.
- About Rothko. Oxford University Press, Inc., 1983.
- The Delicate Thread: Teshigahara's Life in Art. Kodansha USA Press, 1997.
- David Rankin: The New York Years. Macmillan Art Publishing, 2013.
