= Ian McCausland =

Australian visual artist (1944–2022)

- Born: 1944
- Died: 2022 (aged 77–78)
- Website: ianmccauslandart.com

Ian McCausland (31 March 1944 – 9 August 2022) was an Australian artist best known for his music posters.

== Career ==
Ian McCausland began his visual arts career in 1968 after winning a competition in Go-Set, an Australian music magazine. After Go-Set closed in 1974, Philip Frazer took several of their creative team to a new political publication called The Digger, including McCausland as Art Director.

Following the closure of The Digger, McCausland worked for Planet, a weekly music newspaper which was started by Michael Gudinski and Ray Evans. The newspaper ran for two years until 1972, but its founders formed Mushroom Records and McCausland joined them as the label's Art Director and designed their logo. His first work was The Great Australian Rock Festival, Sunbury 1973, a triple LP recording of the 1973 Sunbury Pop Festival. He went on to design album covers for Skyhooks, Daddy Cool, Chain, and Jo Jo Zep & The Falcons, and the tour poster for The Rolling Stones 1973 Australian tour.

Although McCausland designed artwork for The Rolling Stones' album Goat's Head Soup the artwork was lost in the mail. A commission for their next album was rejected, with the band instead going with Andy Warhol. McCausland also created the title design for the 1986 Australian film Dogs in Space.

McCausland died in August 2022. His work was previously featured in Ed Nimmervoll’s book Under the Covers, and has been featured in exhibitions of music posters.
