= Spellbound (soundtrack) =

2024 soundtrack album by Alan Menken and Glenn Slater

Spellbound (Soundtrack From the Netflix Film by Skydance Animation)

Soundtrack album by Alan Menken, Glenn Slater and the cast of Spellbound
- Released: November 22, 2024
- Recorded: 2020–2024
- Genre: Film soundtrack; musical theatre
- Length: 61:23
- Label: Republic
- Producer: Alan Menken; Chris Montan

Alan Menken chronology
The Little Mermaid (2023)	Spellbound (2024)

Spellbound (Soundtrack From the Netflix Film by Skydance Animation) is the soundtrack album to the 2024 animated musical fantasy comedy film Spellbound directed by Vicky Jenson and produced by Skydance Animation for Netflix; the film features the voices of Rachel Zegler, John Lithgow, Jenifer Lewis, Tituss Burgess, Nathan Lane, Javier Bardem, and Nicole Kidman. It contains the film's score and songs from the film composed by Alan Menken and Glenn Slater.

The soundtrack was released through Republic Records on November 22, 2024, the same day as the film. "The Way It Was Before (End Credits Version)", performed by Lauren Spencer Smith, preceded as the lead single.

== Background and development ==
In April 2020, composer Alan Menken announced that he would be working on the project. The following month, Skydance announced that Menken had reteamed with song lyricist Glenn Slater and executive music producer Chris Montan. Both of them joined the film very early in production, even when the film's outline was very vague, as with earlier animated films where the songs develop as the fabric for the film. Slater admitted that the film had eight places which had huge emotional and comic moments; these were described as the "cinder blocks" as it served them the foundations for the piece. Menken and Slater discussed with the producers to develop the songs at these particular cinder blocks, which were looked in a dramatic way.

The challenges with the film, were there were no romantic moments or having an antagonist, but the composers wanted them to hold people's attention and hold the emotional thread. Part of the film revolves around Ellian's journey, where "[It was] that idea of a 15-year-old girl who is brave and strong and resourceful—that's every animated heroine—but also one who is hiding how she really feels from her parents." Some of the musical piece's resort on Ellian's relationship with her parents and her self-discovery, which led to the duo creating dark and operatic moments in the underscore.

The songwriting and composing process began during the COVID-19 pandemic lockdown in late 2020, with both Menken and Slater supervising the sessions through Zoom.

== Release ==
The soundtrack to Spellbound was released through Republic Records on November 22, 2024. It was preceded by "The Way It Was Before (End Credits Version)", performed by Lauren Spencer Smith, as the lead single on November 15.

== Track listing ==
All lyrics are written by Glenn Slater; all music is composed by Alan Menken.

No.	Title	Artist(s)	Length
1.	"My Parents Are Monsters"	Rachel Zegler; John Lithgow; Jenifer Lewis	4:11
2.	"Step by Step"	Zegler; Lithgow; Lewis	3:25
3.	"How to Break the Spell"	Nathan Lane; Tituss Burgess	0:40
4.	"The Way It Was Before"	Zegler	3:43
5.	"Look for the Light"	Zegler; Lane; Burgess	3:50
6.	"Remembering"	Zegler; Javier Bardem; Nicole Kidman	2:50
7.	"I Could Get Used to This"	Lithgow	3:06
8.	"What About Me"	Zegler	2:10
9.	"What About Us – The Way It Was Before" (Reprise)	Zegler; Bardem; Kidman	4:04
10.	"My Monsters Are Parents"	Zegler	1:09
11.	"The Way It Was Before" (End Credits Version)	Lauren Spencer Smith	3:46
12.	"Elian and Her Parents Suite"	Alan Menken	9:02
13.	"Journey Suite"	Menken	8:38
14.	"Lord Candypants"	Menken	2:12
15.	"Oracles Suite"	Menken	4:43
16.	"Flinks Suite"	Menken	2:51
Total length:			60:20

== Critical reception ==
Filmtracks wrote "the score for Spellbound represents a solid Menken outing but isn't his finest work. The very satisfying strength of the songs carries the whole soundtrack, the score providing the instrumental renditions of every melody at some point and its two longest suites impressive [...] a highly enjoyable musical overall, reinforcing Menken's unique voice in the industry." Kate Erbland of IndieWire wrote "A starry voice cast and kicky songs from Alan Menken and Glenn Slater elevate this original animated musical". Ben Kenigsberg of The New York Times noted the songs being "would-be earworms by Alan Menken and Glenn Slater that are catchy in the moment but that you might struggle to hum afterward. Lithgow’s “I Could Get Used to This,” an “Under the Sea”-style showstopper that his character sings after swapping bodies with Ellian’s purple rodent pet, is an exception."

Peter Debruge of Variety wrote "the music (by eight-time Oscar-winning composer Alan Menken) would surely convince you it was a Disney movie you were hearing." Glenn Garner of Deadline Hollywood wrote "Featuring music composed by Alan Menken (The Little Mermaid, Beauty and the Beast, Aladdin), audiences can expect a family-friendly soundtrack that kids will likely be singing on repeat for a while. “Look for the Light” is a cute song by the Oracles, reminiscent of Lane’s Timon in The Lion King. Lithgow’s purple Flink leading an ensemble of blue peers in “I Could Get Used to This” is enough to keep fans anticipating a spinoff. Kidman and Bardem remind audiences of their vocal chops on the track “Remembering” with Zegler, who also shows off a darker side on “What About Me.”" However, Benjamin Lee of The Guardian criticized the songs as "forgettable".
