= Just Like That (novel) =

1994 novel by Australian author Lily Brett

- First edition
- Author: Lily Brett
- Genre: Autobiographical novel
- Publisher: Macmillan (Australia) & André Deutsch (UK)
- Publication date: 1994
- Publication place: United States
- Media type: Print (hardback and paperback)
- Pages: 410
- ISBN: 0-7329-0794-2 (Australian) & ISBN 0-233-98914-5 (UK hardback edition)
- OCLC: 32697583
- Dewey Decimal: 813 20
- LC Class: PR9619.3.B693 J87 1994

Just Like That (1994) is a novel by Lily Brett about Holocaust survivors in the United States.

== Plot ==
Up to a point, the novel is somewhat autobiographical: The author was born in Germany in 1946 and came to Melbourne, Australia with her parents in 1948. She is married to painter David Rankin; they have three children and currently live in New York.

The novel chronicles the lives of a group of Jews – or rather, a Jewish family – in the U.S.A., in particular New York City, over a period of roughly seven months during 1991 and 1992. There is little action. Rather, the novel describes in greater detail the feelings of the protagonist and what goes on in her immediate surroundings. Most of the characters in the novel are Jewish, and the reader gets a vivid picture of the lives of assimilated Jews in the U.S.A. It is told by a third person narrator who is very close to Esther Zepler's thoughts. There are frequent flashbacks to both the distant and the not-so-distant past and numerous references to the Holocaust.

== Characters ==
- Edek Zepler – a Holocaust survivor born Edek Zeleznikow
- Rooshka Zepler – his wife
- Esther Zepler – daughter to Edek and Rooshka, protagonist
- Sonia Kaufman – Esther's best friend
- Josl & Henia Borenstein – Edek's friends from the old country, Holocaust survivors
- Joseph & Laraine Reiser – rich New York Jews

== Awards ==
Just Like That was awarded the Christina Stead Prize for Fiction in 1995.
