= Hall Greenland =

Personal details
- Party: Greens NSW
- Spouse: Fenella Souter
- Profession: Politician, journalist, historian

Hall Barry Greenland (born 1944), is an Australian political activist. He participated in the Freedom Rides. He studied history at the University of Sydney in the 1960s and was a president of the Labor Club in 1964. As an editor of Honi Soit in 1966 he was highly critical of the war in Vietnam. During the 1970s he wrote for Rolling Stone and The Digger. He served on Leichhardt Council and is the recipient of a Walkley Award. In 2013 he was the Australian Greens candidate for Grayndler.

He is the author of a biography of Nick Origlass, Red Hot: The Life and Times of Nick Origlass.

== Freedom Rides ==
He was one of the participants of the Australian Freedom Rides in 1965, along with figures such as activist Charles Perkins, QC Jim Spigelmen, journalist Darce Cassidy, and historian Ann Curthoys. The Freedom Ride was inspired by the Freedom Riders of the Civil Rights Movement. The Freedom Riders were all University students, and planned to go on a trip around country NSW exposing racism towards the indigenous community. They formed their own group, the Student Action for Aborigines (SAFA) The Freedom Riders had three purposes:

1. Draw attention to the state of Aboriginal health, education, and housing.
2. Point out a lessen the barriers to racially equality.
3. Encourage Aboriginal people to resist discrimination.

The Freedom Riders picketed the Walgett RSL about its refusal to allow Aboriginal ex-servicemen to use the facilities. At Moree, they successfully desegregated the local swimming pool. At Bowraville they protested against the segregation of a cinema there.

Resistance from local non-indigenous people was common. The tour bus was followed out of Walgett during the night and rammed off the road.

Hall Greenland states of the Freedom Ride: "I like to think the Freedom Ride was a success. It exposed the under-belly of small town racism and marked the renaissance of Aboriginal activism in Australia."

== Greens Candidature ==
In 2013 he was the Australian Greens candidate for the left-leaning, inner sydney seat of Grayndler. He faced incumbent Labor candidate, Deputy Prime Minister Anthony Albanese, where he came third with 23.03% of the first-preference vote. The Greens experienced a swing of −2.87% in Grayndler, however this was above the national average of a −3.11% swing against the Greens. Greenland was elected Convenor of the NSW Greens on 19–20 October 2013.

== Works ==
- The Well Dressed Revolutionary: The Odyssey of Michel Pablo in the Age of Uprisings, No 75. IIRE notebook/Resistance book, 2023.
