= David Rankin (artist) =

Australian artist

David Rankin is a New York-based Australian artist. He works predominantly in oil painting and acrylic on canvas, but also works with paper, prints, sculptures and ceramics. Rankin has held over 100 one-person exhibitions in cities across the world and his work forms part of many of the world's leading collections and museums.

== Early life and work ==
David Rankin was born in Plymouth, Devon, England in 1946 then emigrated to Australia with his family in 1948. He spent his childhood in the 1950s in the semi-rural Port Hacking region, south of Sydney, and his teenage years in country New South Wales, from Hay, Wagga Wagga and Albury in the south to Bourke and Brewarrina in the north.

Rankin is self-taught, developing his techniques and ideas in the outback towns of his youth. He was inspired by the greats from Leonardo da Vinci to Paul Klee as well as being influenced by the history of Buddhism and Asian art.

In his travels before he arrived in Sydney in 1967 he developed a concept of what he wanted to achieve as an Australian artist. His dream was to express the anima, the life spirit or the essence of God in all nature. As an Australian artist he believed could bring the elements of Western Art together with an understanding and love for the cultures of Asia and the Australian Aborigine. He also felt that as Australia was closer to Asia than Europe it made sense to think about the art of Indian, Chinese and Japanese artists, and that one could not be an authentic articulate Australian artist without a love and respect for the artistic and spiritual expressions of the various Aboriginal Australian peoples and cultures.

In Sydney Rankin had his first exhibition through Watters Gallery at age 22.

== Personal ==
In 1979 his first wife, Jennifer Mary Roberts (née Haynes) died. Rankin subsequently met his current wife Lily Brett, whose own life was etched by tragedy with her parents being survivors of the Holocaust. She too migrated to Australia as a child after the Second World War in 1948. The artist recounts that his empathy for Lily and the pity for his first wife's death fused into what he calls "the dark blessing of my life." The darkness was transformed into images. The author Dore Ashton writes that the events of 1979 and the fire which ravaged his studio in 1997 and burnt his art works and many personal possessions, had a profound impact on his work.

Having personal life experiences as his subject matter, Rankin's paintings contemplate these things. For example, his Jerusalem series followed a trip to Jerusalem in 1988, which then led to his Golgotha works. His travels to the Australian, American and Mexican deserts became the subject matter for many of his canvases, such as Ridge – Mungo, Golden Prophecy – San Antonio, Grey Sonora Landscape and then led to his Witness Series. From the fire in his studio he then painted Buddha and Flames. He illustrated two books by Lily Brett on the holocaust and explored the theme further in his huge work The Drowned and The Saved from a book by Primo Levi of the same name. Through Brett he encountered Jewish mythology and painted Black Menorah and Black Tfiln and as a testament to his love for her created his Husband and Wife Series including Husband and Wife Triptych III, and Husband and Wife – Ying and Yang.

In 1989 Rankin moved with his wife to New York City. From their home in New York they continue to explore both their Australian roots and culture and the opportunities and challenges of being part of an international community. Their three children, including celebrated artist Jessica Rankin, also live in New York. His daughter-in-law is artist Julie Mehretu.

== Career ==
In the past 30 years Rankin has held over 100 one-person exhibitions in cities including Paris, Beijing, New York, Cologne and throughout Australia. He is represented in many of the world's leading collections and museums, including the National Gallery of Victoria. He was selected as Australia's official representative in the UNESCO Fortieth Anniversary Exhibition celebrations that toured the world's capitals. He was featured in the Salon de Mai in Paris and the Chicago Art Fair. Among the many prizes and awards he has been honored with is the 1983 Wynne Prize, Australia's premier landscape prize. Recently an English-German monograph on his work titled "The Walls of the Heart: The Work and Life of David Rankin" was published by US critic and art historian Dore Ashton. In 2005–2006 a major exhibition of Rankin's art, curated by Dore Ashton, toured through public galleries in Australia.

Among his many commissioned works are The Scorched Earth, 1984–1985, oil on canvas, diptych at the Victorian Arts Centre, Melbourne. The Committee for Bosnia, commissioned a poster, A Day for Bosnia, at The University of Chicago. His oil paintings, large watercolours and ceramics appear at the New York Vista Hotel.

In September 2013, a book by Dore Ashton on David Rankin's work titled David Rankin: The New York Years was released.

Rankin was awarded the Medal of the Order of Australia in the 2021 Queen's Birthday Honours.

== See also ==
- List of Australian artists
- Jessica Rankin – artist, David Rankin's daughter

== Bibliography ==
- Brenson, Michael: "David Rankin", The New York Times, New York City, 21 December 1990; p39
- Carrier, David: "David Rankin’s Jerusalem Paintings", in the catalogue for David Rankin, The Jerusalem Paintings, Ruggiero Gallery, New York City, 1989
- Handy, Ellen: "Light of Australia, Walls of Jerusalem", Arts Magazine, New York City. December 1989 [Vol. 64, No. 4]; pages 51–55
- Larson, Kay: "Art", New York Magazine, New York City, 17 December 1990; p77
- Elwyn Lynn: "Rankin at Macquarie", The Australian, Sydney; November 1990
- Lynn, Victoria: "Balance and Duality in the Work of David Rankin", Art and Australia, Summer 1996
- Sheffield, Margaret: "David Rankin", Review, New York City, May 1997
- Bleiker, Roland: "Political Abstraction in the Work of David Rankin", Social Alternatives, St Lucia. October 2001 [Vol. 20, No. 4]; pages 3–8, 16–21.
- Dore Ashton: The Walls of the Heart: The Work and Life of David Rankin, Wien: Christian Brandstätter Verlag, 2001.
- Dore Ashton: "After the Fire", David Rankin: Works 1967–2004, touring exhibition catalogue, Tweed River Art Gallery, Murwillumbah 2005.
- Jeannet, Frédéric-Yves: "From the Heartland to a Hinterland", David Rankin: Works 1967–2004, touring exhibition catalogue, Tweed River Art Gallery, Murwillumbah 2005.
- Dore Ashton: David Rankin – The Crossings Paintings, exhibition catalogue, Andre Zarre Gallery, New York City, October 2006.
- New York Arts International
