= Jennifer Rankin =

Australian poet and playwright

- Born: Jennifer Mary Rankin; 28 November 1941; Chatswood, New South Wales, Australia
- Died: 8 December 1979 (aged 38); Melbourne, Victoria, Australia
- Occupations: Poet and playwright

Jennifer Rankin (born Jennifer Mary Haynes) (28 November 1941 – 8 December 1979) was an Australian poet and playwright.

== Early life and education ==
Jennifer Mary Haynes was born in Chatswood, New South Wales, on 28 November 1941. She grew up in Sydney and went to Ravenswood Methodist School. She then studied English and psychology at University of Sydney, graduating with a Bachelor of Arts in 1962. At university, she was affiliated with the Downtown Push, "a loose group of artists, bohemians, and libertarians which included Clive James and Germaine Greer". She later completed a Diploma of Education at UNE in 1968.

== Writing ==
Her first surviving poems date from 1969; her first play, untitled, from 1973. Some of her plays (there are eight in all), were produced for stage and radio during her lifetime. She received an Australia Council Senior Literary Fellowship in 1978 and had two books of poems published. The first, Ritual Shift, was published in 1976. Her Collected Poems was edited posthumously by Judith Rodriguez and published in 1990.

== Works ==
=== Bibliography ===
- Art Workshop (1974)
- Ritual Shift (1976)
- Earth Hold (1978)
- The Mud Hut (1979)
- Jennifer Rankin: Collected Poems. Ed. Judith Rodriguez (1990)

=== Plays ===
- Bees (1974)
- Razorback Mountain Journey (1976)
- Night Spaces
- Surfaces
- I Heard the Door Close
- A Steady Face
- Catwalk
- The Darling's Been Done

=== Recordings ===
- Oral history (1980)

== Personal life and legacy ==
She was first married to John Roberts, having a son in 1965. After separating in 1966, she lived for a time with writer Frank Moorhouse. In 1969, she married painter David Rankin. She died in Melbourne from cancer on 8 November 1979. Her daughter with Rankin, Jessica, later became an artist. Jennifer Rankin Lane in Canberra is named in her honour.
