= I'm Off Then =

Travel book by Hape Kerkeling

I'm Off Then: Losing and Finding Myself on the Camino de Santiago
- Author: Hape Kerkeling
- Original title: Ich bin dann mal weg
- Language: German
- Published: 2006
- English publication date: 2009
- ISBN: 9781416553878

I'm Off Then: Losing and Finding Myself on the Camino de Santiago (German: Ich bin dann mal weg) is a book by German writer Hape Kerkeling published in 2006 and translated into English in 2009. It has sold over three million copies and has also been translated into French, Italian, Dutch, Polish, Latvian, Spanish, Korean, and Chinese.

A film adaptation, directed by Julia von Heinz, featuring Devid Striesow and Martina Gedeck, was released on December 24, 2015.
