= Ponch Hawkes =

Australian photographer (born 1946)

Ponch Hawkes (born 1946) is an Australian photographer whose work explores intergenerational relationships, queer identity and LGBTQI+ rights, the female body, masculinity, and women at work, capturing key moments in Australia's cultural and social histories.

== Early life and education ==
Hawkes was born in Abbotsford, Victoria, in 1946 and educated at University High School. She is self-taught, having never formally studied photography. Upon returning to Australia from the United States in the early 1970s, Hawkes, who was working as a journalist for the magazine The Digger, took up photography to enhance her journalistic work.

== Work ==
Her work has been included in major Australian exhibitions such as Melbourne Now (2013) at the National Gallery of Victoria and Know My Name (2021/22) at the National Gallery of Australia. Hawke's work is represented in the collections of numerous significant institutions including the National Gallery of Victoria, National Gallery of Australia, Queensland Art Gallery, State Library of Victoria, City of Melbourne, Horsham Regional Gallery, Monash Gallery of Art, the Women's Art Register, and the Jewish Museum of Australia. Hawkes has collaborated with the Pram factory and Circus Oz, and was the first administrator of the Women's Theatre Group in the 1970s.

Hawkes' photographic work is broad in its scope, including the portrayal of artists, feminists, sportspeople, public figures and candid street-photographs. The photographs are often exhibited as a series or multiples, and the subjects in the work are often invited to actively participate in the process. Through this method, Hawkes pursues a sustained interest in the way individuals use their bodies and the way individuals relate, through their bodies, to each other. Hawke's first exhibited body of work, the 1976 photo essay Our Mums and Us, featured her female friends and their mothers, among them the writer Helen Garner. More recent projects have explored the ageing female body such as in the monumental work 500 strong (2021), that reclaims bodies from shame, empowers the subjects portrayed, and normalises images of older women. The under-representation of women in politics is explored in the humorous work Changing Faces: Reframing Women in Local Democracy (2020), that depicts 171 local women wearing fake moustaches and beards to challenge gender stereotypes. Hawkes' extensive career is considered an influential part of the Australian feminist art movement.

== Exhibitions ==
=== Selected solo exhibitions ===
- 500 Strong, Geelong Art Gallery, Shepparton Art Museum, curated by Jane Scott, 2022
- Changing Faces, Bayside City Council Chambers, Melbourne, 2020
- Our Mums and Us and These Women have Just Run 26 Miles, Monash Gallery of Art, Melbourne, Australia, 2013
- Eros, Philos and Agape, Melbourne Cricket Ground, 2012
- Basil Sellers Creative Arts Fellow, National Sports Museum, MCG, 2011–12
- More seeing is NOT Understanding, Monash Gallery of Art, Brisbane Powerhouse, Portland, Redlands Qld, Albury, 2009
- Seeing Is Not Understanding, Horsham Regional Gallery, 2009
- Trading Places, Heritage Hill Museum, Dandenong and Immigration Museum, Melbourne, 2006
- Risk, Monash Gallery of Art, 2005
- Sensation, Chrysalis Gallery, East Melbourne, 2005
- They're downstairs, North Melbourne Arts House, 2003
- Todah, Jewish Museum, St Kilda, Melbourne, 2001
- Ponch Hawkes--A Survey, Gippsland Art Gallery, Sale, Victoria, 2000
- St Vincent’s at Home, Aikenhead Gallery, Melbourne 1999
- Relatively Speaking, The Family in Words and Pictures, Chrissie Cotter Gallery, Sydney, and Centre for Contemporary Photography, Melbourne, 1998
- Photoworks, Victoria University Gallery, Melbourne, 1997
- Circus Oz, Performing Arts Museum Collection, Westpac Gallery, Victorian Arts Centre, Melbourne, 1997
- Best Mates, William Mora Gallery, Melbourne, 1990
- Generations, National Gallery of Victoria, Melbourne, 1989
- Circus Oz in Performance, La Trobe University Gallery and Watters Gallery, Sydney, 1981
- Our Mums and Us, Brummels Gallery, Melbourne 1976

=== Selected group exhibitions ===
- Women Photographers 1900–1975: A Legacy of Light, National Gallery of Victoria, Melbourne, Australia, 2025–2026
- Parched. La Trobe Art Institute, Melbourne, Victoria, 2024
- Flesh After Fifty, Changing Images of Older Women in Art, Abbotsford Convent, Melbourne, Australia, 2021
- In Her Words, a Horsham Regional Art Gallery Collection travelling exhibition, 2019–2020
- Photography Meets Feminism: Australian women photographers 1970s–80s, a Monash Gallery of Art travelling exhibition, 2014–2015
- Beyond Borders, MAP Group, Ballarat International Photo Biennale, 2015
- Melbourne Now, National Gallery of Victoria, 2013–2014
- KHEM, Strange Neighbour, Melbourne, Curated by Linsey Gosper, April 11 – May 3, 2014
- Take A Bow, Ballarat Mechanics Institute, 2013
- Mining The Collection, Albury City Gallery, 2011
- Brummels, Monash Gallery of Art, 2011
- Mapping Ballarat, Ballarat Foto Biennale, 2011
- Basil Sellers Art prize, (finalist) Ian Potter Museum of Art, 2011
- Timelines, National Gallery of Victoria, 2011
- Mapping Ballarat, Ballarat International Foto Biennale, 2009
- Beyond Reasonable Drought, Old Parliament House, Canberra and touring, 2007
- Raised by Wolves, Art Gallery of Western Australia, 2006
- Julie Millowick Aquisitive Prize, Castlemaine Festival (winner), 2006
- Murray Cod: The Biggest Fish in the River, Swan Hill Gallery and 5 other venues, 2006
- Blake prize for Religious Art (finalist), 2006
- Josephine Ulrick and Win Schubert Photographic Award, Gold Coast City Art Gallery (finalist), 2006
- Olive Cotton Award for Photographic Portraiture, Tweed River Art Gallery, Murwillumbah (finalist), 2006
- Making Hay at Shear Outback Center, Hay, NSW, and Span Galleries, Melbourne, 2006
- The Interior World: photographs and photographers from Glen Eira City Council's Collection, Glen Eira City Gallery, Caulfield South, Melbourne, 2004
- Documenting Australians, A pictorial history of Australian photography, Monash Gallery of Art, Wheelers Hill, 2002
- Images of Australian Men, Photographs from the Monash Gallery of Art collection, travelling exhibition, 2002
- Exhibit X – Group Photographic Exhibition, Lab X Gallery, St Kilda, 2002
- So You Wanna Be a Rock Star, National Portrait Gallery, Canberra, 2002
- Ordinary Women, Extraordinary Lives, Melbourne Museum, touring 10 venues, 2001
- Woman Photographers, Monash City Gallery, 2000
- Feminist Art, RMIT First Line Gallery Melbourne, 1999
- Three Melbourne Photographers, Ballarat Festival, Ballarat, 1997
- The Power to Move, Aspects of Australian Photography, Queensland Art Gallery, Brisbane, 1996
- Six Photographers, Barry Stern Gallery, Sydney, 1995
- On the Edge, Australian Photographers of the Seventies, from the collection of the National Library Australia, San Diego Museum of Art, San Diego, 1994
- All in the family – Selected Australian Portraiture, National Library of Australia, Canberra, 1994
- Domain of the Other, National Gallery of Victoria, Melbourne, 1992
- Defective Models – Australian Portraiture 19th and 20th Centuries, from regional, university and private collections, Monash University Gallery, 1990
- Portrait Photography, National Gallery of Australia, Canberra, 1989
- The Thousand Mile Stare, Australian Centre of Contemporary Art, Melbourne, touring Art and Working Life, Roar Studios, Melbourne, 1988
- Shades of Light – Photography and Australia 1839 to 1988, Australian National Gallery, 1988
- Living in the Seventies, Australian National Gallery, Canberra, 1986
- Australian Photographers, Australian National Gallery, Canberra, 1984
- Photographic Work, Perc Tucker Gallery, Townsville The Critical Distance, Artspace Sydney, 1983
- Melbourne Theatre Photographers, Ministry for the Arts, Melbourne, 1982
- Eight Woman Photographers, Monash University Gallery, Melbourne and Developed Image, Adelaide, 1981
- Woman's Work, La Trobe University Gallery, Melbourne, 1981
- Self Portrait/Self Image, Victorian College of the Arts, Melbourne and touring, 1980
- 100 Artists, Panel Beaters Gallery, Melbourne, 1978
- New Conceptualists, Tokyo, 1977
- Sister’s Delight, Media Resource Centre Gallery, Adelaide, 1977
- Woman Photographers, Pram Factory, Melbourne, 1976

== Publications ==
- Beyond Reasonable Drought, The Map Group of Photographers, Five Mile Press, 2009
- Trading Places, text by David Crofts, photos by Ponch Hawkes, City of Greater Dandenong, 2006
- Art of Reconciliation, edited by Ponch Hawkes, City of Melbourne, 2002
- Australian Water Polo, A Celebration, by Shane Maloney and Ponch Hawkes, Australian Water Polo Inc. 1998
- Women of Substance, Sue Jackson and Gael Wallace with photographs by Ponch Hawkes, Allen and Unwin, 1998
- Unfolding: The Story of the Australian and New Zealand AIDS Quilt Projects, by Ponch Hawkes with text by Ainsley Yardley and Kim Langley, McPhee Gribble, 1994
- Best Mates, A Study of Male Friendship, by Ponch Hawkes, McPhee Gribble and Penguin Books, 1990
- Generations: Grandmothers, Mothers and Daughters, by Diane Bell with photos by Ponch Hawkes, McPhee Gribble & Penguin Books, Melbourne, 1987
- Pay to Play, by Wendy Milson and Helen Thomas with photos by Ponch Hawkes, Penguin,1986
