= Lily Brett =

Australian novelist, essayist and poet

Lily Brett OAM
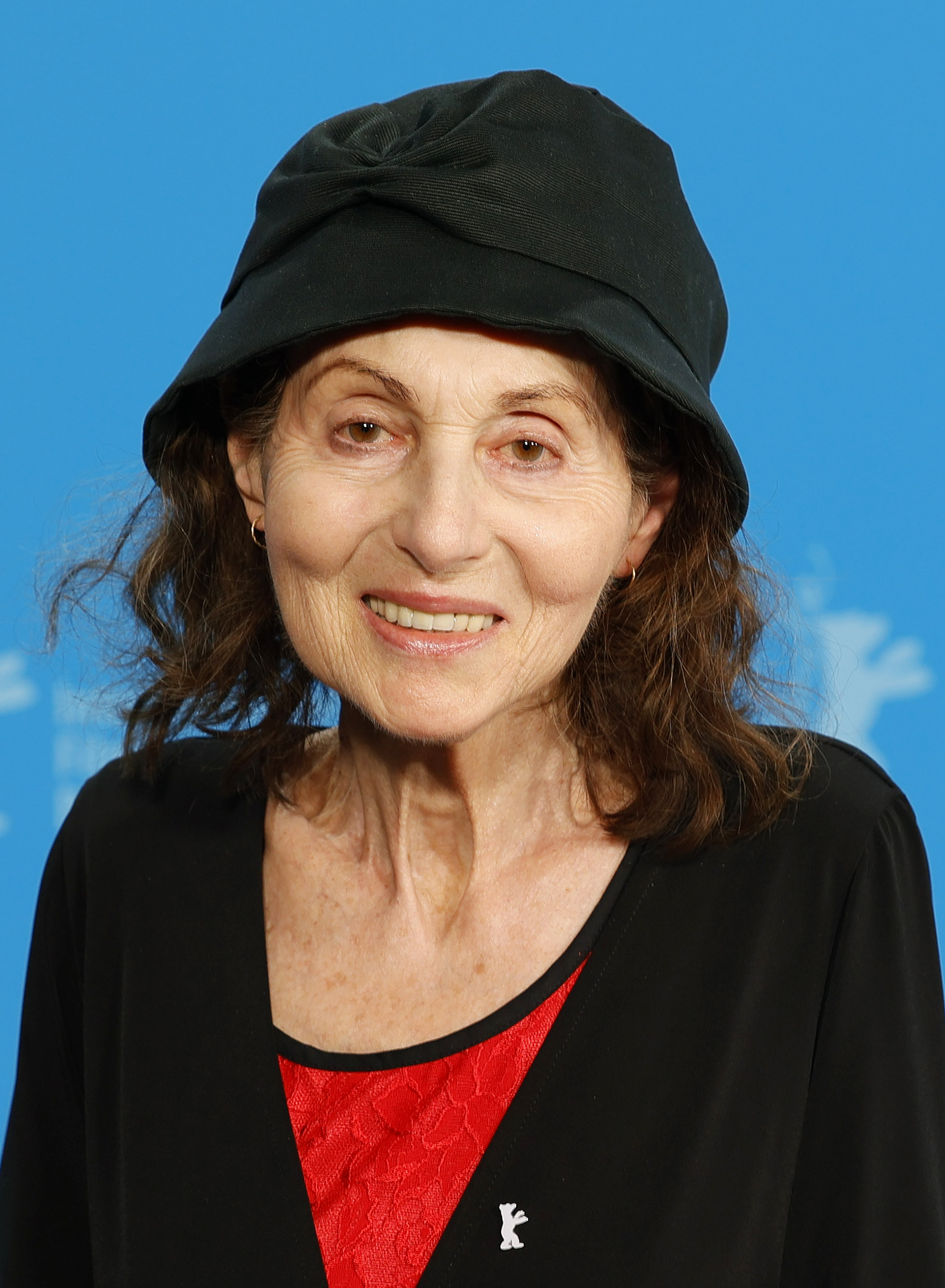
- Lily Brett at 2024 Berlin Film Festival
- Born: Lilijahne Brajtsztajn; 5 September 1946 (age 80); Feldafing displaced persons camp, Bavaria, Germany
- Occupations: Novelist; essayist; poet
- Spouses: Rob Lovett (m. 1968; div. 1979) David Rankin (m. 1981)
- Children: 3
- Writing career
- Language: English
- Years active: 1966–present
- Notable works: The Auschwitz Poems, Things Could Be Worse, Just Like That, Too Many Men, You Gotta Have Balls, Lola Bensky
- Notable awards: C. J. Dennis Prize for Poetry, Commonwealth Writers' Prize Prix Médicis étranger
- Website: lilybrett.com

Lily Brett OAM (born Lilijahne Brajtsztajn 5 September 1946) is an Australian novelist, essayist and poet. She lived in North Carlton and then Elwood/Caulfield (suburbs of Melbourne) from 1948 to 1968, in London 1968–1971, Melbourne (1971–1989) and then moved permanently to New York City. In Australia she had an early career as a pop music journalist, including writing for music magazine Go-Set from May 1966 to September 1968. From 1979 she started writing poems, prose fiction and non-fiction. As a daughter of Holocaust survivors, her works include depictions of family life including living in Melbourne and New York. Four of her fictional novels are Things Could Be Worse (1990), Just Like That (1994), Too Many Men (2001) and You Gotta Have Balls (2005).

== Early life ==
Brett's parents, Max (born Mojsze Brajtsztajn, 1916) and Rose (née Rozka Szpindler, ca. 1921–1986), lived in Łódź, Poland before the outbreak of World War II. During that war they survived more than five years of Nazi control including being confined to the Łódź Ghetto, where they married, in occupied Poland, before being taken to the Auschwitz concentration camp where they were eventually separated. After the European theatre of war ended in May 1945 it took six months for the couple to find each other. Brett was born as Luba Brajsztajn (Germanicised as Lilijahne Breitstein) in 1946 in Feldafing displaced persons camp, Bavaria, Germany.

Brett was aged two (1948) before her parents were able to leave Germany and emigrate to Melbourne, Australia. She later recalled "I grew up in North Carlton knowing there had been a catastrophe, but my parents revealed only odd fragments. Then I started reading about the Holocaust and have never stopped." Her younger sister, Doris Brett, was born in 1950, she later became a clinical psychologist. Rosa worked "behind a sewing machine in a factory." Brett attended University High School, Melbourne but did not matriculate – instead of sitting two of her final exams she watched Hitchcock's Psycho.

== Career ==
In 1966, Brett successfully applied to be a music journalist at pop music weekly, Go-Set, and in May she replaced founding feature writer, Doug Panther. She later reflected, "My career is inexplicable and it's a career path that nobody should follow! It basically starts with an 18-year old refusing to go to university because that was the one thing that my parents wanted of me, that and to be slim. So I defied both of those desires. My mother said I had to get a job, which shocked me. There was a new newspaper opening up in Australia called Go-Set and I walked into the office and I started work the next day. I don't think this would happen today." The paper's editor was Tony Schauble, and according to Go-Set staff photographer, Colin Beard, "[Brett] had been to see Schauble several times and had made a favourable impression on him and more importantly, she had a car, which was an attractive incentive to employ her." Fellow writers included Vince Lovegrove, Molly Meldrum, Ed Nimmervoll and Stan Rofe. In November 1966 Brett was interviewed on The Go!! Show, a Victorian-based pop music show, by its host, Johnny Young (also a pop singer). Young described Brett's style "She seemed genuinely interested in the pop stars she interviewed, but she could also be intimidating at times."

In January 1967 Brett and Beard travelled to the United Kingdom for Go-Set, "where they experienced a swinging live music scene." According to Beard "at first she had little idea about what to write, but eventually developed her own style, which was more personal and intimate than Panther's. Her features in Go-Set showed that she was able to help the musicians feel relaxed and in doing so they would disclose more to her than they had to Panther." As a result of her work, "for the first time Australian teenagers saw that two Australians they knew [were] reporting on the English music scene." The pair then travelled to America to cover the Monterey International Pop Festival (mid-June 1967), before returning to Australia. In 2014 Brett published her fictionalised account of her time in the UK and US in the novel Lola Bensky, including her encounters with Jimi Hendrix, Jim Morrison, Mick Jagger, Janis Joplin and Lillian Roxon. Soon after returning to Australia Brett married Rob Lovett (ex-the Loved Ones guitarist) and the couple had two children. They later divorced, and she married artist David Rankin.

Brett regularly appeared on Uptight, one of the first weekly national TV shows devoted to pop music, it broadcast for four hours on Saturday mornings, which ran from October 1967 to 1969. While working for Go-Set, early in 1968, Brett became a band manager for a newly formed male soul vocal trio, the Virgil Brothers, modelled on the Walker Brothers. The original line-up was her then-partner Lovett, Mick Hadley (ex-Purple Hearts) and Malcolm McGee (ex-Python Lee Jackson). In May Hadley left and was replaced by Peter Doyle. The group issued three singles, "Temptation's 'Bout to Get Me" (June 1968), "Here I Am" (September) and "When You Walk Away" (September 1969). They had relocated to the UK prior to the third single, where they subsequently disbanded.

Brett continued with Go-Set until September 1968, "she wanted more fulfilling work, and was also about to have a family and so needed a better income than the low wages Go-Set Publications paid." After she left Meldrum took on her interview-based "Pop Speak Out" column, however "Meldrum lacked Brett's skill in personalising her columns or being able to get celebrities to disclose deep information; on top of this he also lacked Panther's literacy." Another aspect of her Go-Set work was record reviews, which were taken up by Nimmervoll, he was "more descriptive, knowledge-based, and historically comparative than Brett's reviews. In the limited column space available, Nimmervoll captured the meaning of the recording and its place in rock music history." In January 1969 her cover story on Johnny Farnham appeared in the second edition of Gas (an offshoot of Go-Set). Renowned academic Samuel Fell explains that by traveling to London, New York, Los Angeles and Monterey in 1967, and interviewing the world’s leading pop stars including Jimi Hendrix, Janis Joplin and Mick Jagger, Lily Brett ended the sense of cultural isolation and irrelevance of many of the young 1960's generation of Australians.

From 1979 she resumed writing: including poetry, prose fiction and non-fiction. Brett published her first collection of poetry, The Auschwitz Poems, in 1986, which was illustrated by Rankin's drawings. Winning many awards, The Auschwitz Poems was awarded the Victorian Premier's Literary Awards: C. J. Dennis Prize for Poetry in 1987. Her short story, "Luba", was entered in the National Short Story of the Year competition in 1988 and received an honourable mention. It was printed in The Canberra Times, one of the competition's sponsors, in December. In the following year Brett moved from Melbourne to New York City with Rankin.

Brett's first work of fiction, Things Could Be Worse, appeared in 1990. Stephanie Green of The Canberra Times described it in April that year as a set of "self-contained [stories], they are all about a group of Jewish immigrants living in Melbourne after World War II. The characters form a community, strive to success in a new land, fend off the memories of war, and hold on to their sense of what it means to be Jewish in the face of centuries of displacement." Green's fellow reviewer, Helen Elliott, felt Just Like That (1994) showed that "The joke, and the entire seriousness of this brilliant novel, lies in the way Brett has turned the anguish of generations into art... [and] has created an unusually lovely woman [Ester Zepler, the protagonist], full of laughter, torn with anxiety, capable of malice and brimming with love."

Her fifth and most celebrated novel, Too Many Men, was published in 2001. Publishers Weekly's staff writer felt that "The hardest effect to bring off in fiction is a vision that is at once tender, deeply comic and yet aware of the ultimate sadness of life, the lachrymae rerum. Brett has succeeded triumphantly." Too Many Men won the Commonwealth Writers' Prize in 2000 for the Best Book from the South-East Asia and South Pacific Region. Her next novel, You Gotta Have Balls (2005), is the third to feature Ruth Rothwax and her father Edek. Helen Greenwood of The Sydney Morning Herald finds that "Brett herself travels a brave road to joy, instead of the tracks of despair, which is not an easy path for a born worrier. To do so, she sidelines one of the major characters in her work, the Holocaust, and the book is the less for it.". This book has seen significant success, especially in Europe, and has been translated into many languages and been made into a major theatre production in Germany and is touring Europe. The stage adaptation of You Gotta Have Balls, titled Chuzpe in German, starring Otto Schenk, opened at the Kammerspiele Theatre in Vienna in November 2012, was later staged at the Münchner Kammerspiele (2014) and played at the Theater am Kurfürstendamm in 2016.

Lola Bensky (2013), Brett's seventh novel was short-listed for the Miles Franklin Literary Award and it received the 2014 Prix Medicis étranger prize in France. Brett has published ten volumes of poetry, four collections of essays, and seven novels. She has also contributed writings to a wide range of newspaper and literary publications, including many columns and articles in Die Zeit, The Australian, Die Welt, Le Monde, Libération, Sydney Morning Herald, The Age, Frankfurter Allgemeine Zeitung. A portrait of Lily Brett hangs in the National Portrait Gallery.

The movie adaptation of "Too Many Men", titled Treasure was directed by Julia Von Heinz, and stars Lena Dunham, and Stephen Fry. 'Treasure had its global premiere at the 74th Berlin International Film Festival, and its US premiere at the Tribeca Film Festival on June 8, 2024. A movie edition of the book retitled Treasure was published by William Morrow in May 2024 in the US.

== Bibliography ==
=== Fiction ===
- "Luba" (short story, 28 December 1988)
- Things Could Be Worse (1990)
- What God Wants (1992)
- Just Like That (1994)
- Collected Stories (1999)
- Too Many Men (2001)
- You Gotta Have Balls (2005)
- Lola Bensky (2013)
- Treasure (2024) - movie tie-in edition

=== Non-fiction ===
- In Full View (1997) Macmillan Australia ISBN 978-0-7329-0895-9
- New York (2001) Picador Australia ISBN 978-0-330-36245-0
- Between Mexico and Poland (2002) Picador Australia ISBN 978-0-330-36386-0
- Only in New York (2014) Suhrkamp ISBN 978-3-518-46869-2
- Only the others are old (2020) Suhrkamp ISBN 978-3-518-42946-4
- Old Seems To Be Other People (2021) Penguin Random House ISBN 978-1-761-04234-8

=== Poetry ===
- The Auschwitz Poems (1986)
- Brett, Lily; Rankin, David (1987), Poland and other poems, Brunswick, Vic: Scribe, ISBN 978-0-908011-13-1
- Brett, Lily; Rankin, David (1990), After the war: poems, Carlton, Vic: Melbourne University Press, ISBN 978-0-522-84415-3
- Unintended Consequences (1992)
- In Her Strapless Dresses (1994) Picador Australia ISBN 978-0-330-35589-6
- Mud in My Tears (1997) Picador Australia ISBN 978-0-330-36011-1
- Poems by Lily Brett (2001) Picador Australia ISBN 978-0-330-36291-7
- Blistered Days (2007) Picador Australia ISBN 978-0-330-42287-1
- Liebesgedichte (Love Poems) (2008)
- Wenn Wir Bleiben Könnten (If We Could Stay) (2014)

== Awards and nominations ==
- 1986 – Mattara Poetry Prize – "Poland"
- 1987 – Victorian Premier's Literary Awards: C. J. Dennis Prize for Poetry – The Auschwitz Poems
- 1992 – The Steele Rudd Award for What God Wants
- 1995 – New South Wales Premier's Literary Awards, Christina Steadman Prize for Fiction for Just Like That
- 2000 – Commonwealth Writers' Prize in 2000 for the Best Book from the South-East Asia and South Pacific Region- Too Many Men
- 2000 – Too Many Men short-listed for the Miles Franklin Award
- 2013 – Lola Bensky short-listed for the Miles Franklin Award
- 2014 – Lola Bensky Prix Médicis étranger (France)
- 2021 – Medal of the Order of Australia in the 2021 Queen's Birthday Honours, for "service to literature as a writer".
