= Julia von Heinz =

German film director (born 1976)

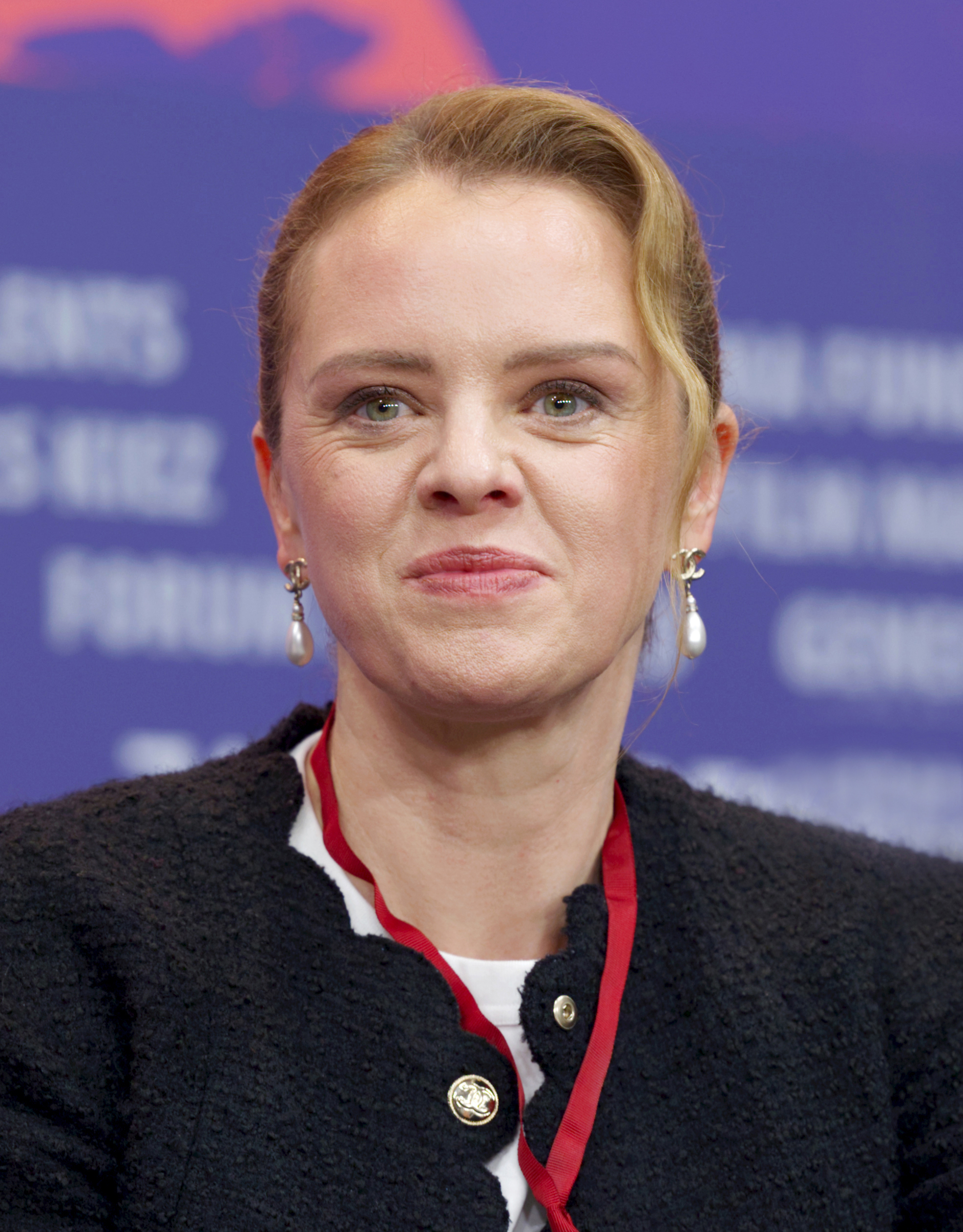
- Von Heinz in 2024
- Born: 3 June 1976 (age 50); Berlin, Germany
- Occupations: Film director and screenwriter
- Spouse: John Quester
- Children: 3

Julia von Heinz (born 3 June 1976 in West Berlin) is a German film director and screenwriter.

== Life and work ==
Her debut feature film Nothing Else Matters, a coming of age-drama, premiered at Berlin International Film Festival in 2007, was shown at numerous international festivals and won awards.

After that, she shot the documentary film Standesgemäß (2008) about single aristocratic women.

In 2012, her children's film Hanni & Nanni 2, based on the series of novels by Enid Blyton, and her bestseller adaptation I'm Off Then were box office hits in Germany.

Together with the directors Tom Tykwer, Chris Kraus, Robert Thalheim and Axel Ranisch, she made the documentary film Pink Children (2012) about their common mentor Rosa von Praunheim.

Her greatest international success until then was And Tomorrow the Entire World (2020). It was shown in competition at Venice Film Festival. Mala Emde won the Independent Critics Award for best actress at the festival. In this feature film von Heinz processed her own experiences as a teenager in Antifa.

Von Heinz returned to Venice in 2021 with her film Isolation, a compilation film she made with the directors Michael Winterbottom, Jaco Van Dormael, Michele Placido and Olivier Guerpillon.

In 2023 Julia von Heinz directed Treasure, starring Lena Dunham and Stephen Fry. It was based on the bestselling novel Too Many Men by Lily Brett and premiered at Berlin International Film Festival in 2024. Treasure is the third part of Julia von Heinz’ Aftermath-Trilogy that deals with the lasting effects of the Holocaust on following generations.

In 2024 Julia von Heinz was invited to be a jury member for the competition at Venice Film Festival.

From 2005 to 2006, Julia von Heinz worked as a personal assistant for director and professor Rosa von Praunheim at Konrad Wolf Film University of Babelsberg. In 2012 von Heinz received her Ph.D. with a focus on film. She is head of the directing department at University of Television and Film Munich since 2023.

Von Heinz is married to John Quester, a screenwriter with whom she has co-written several projects. The couple have three children.

== Awards (selection) ==
- 2008: Special Jury Award at Torino International Gay & Lesbian Film Festival (Nothing Else Matters)
- 2009: Bavarian TV Award for Best Documentary (Standesgemäß)
- 2012: Golden Sparrow of the Children's Jury at German Children's Film & TV-Festival (Hanni and Nanni 2)
- 2020: Nomination for the Golden Lion at Venice Film Festival (And Tomorrow the Entire World)
- 2020: Gold Hugo for Best Ensemble at Chicago International Film Festival (And Tomorrow the Entire World)
- 2021: Inclusion Award at Venice Film Festival (Isolation)
- 2021: Bavarian Film Award for Best Feature Film (And Tomorrow the Entire World)
- 2021: Film Award of the City of Hof (Honorary Award) at Hof International Film Festival
- 2023: Bavarian TV Award for Best Directing (Eldorado KaDeWe)
- 2024: German Film Peace Prize – Die Brücke (Treasure)

== Filmography (selection) ==
- 2001: Dienstags
- 2007: Nothing Else Matters
- 2008: Standesgemäß
- 2012: Hanni & Nanni 2
- 2012: Pink Children
- 2013: Hanna's Journey
- 2015: I'm Off Then
- 2020: And Tomorrow the Entire World
- 2021: Isolation
- 2021: Eldorado KaDeWe (mini-series)
- 2024: Treasure
- TBA: She Gets It from Me
