= Lola Bensky =

2012 novel by Lily Brett

- Author: Lily Brett
- Publisher: Hamish Hamilton
- Publication date: 2012
- ISBN: 9780143569190

Lola Bensky is the sixth novel by Australian author and poet Lily Brett. It was published by Hamish Hamilton in 2012. The novel, which won the 2014 Prix Médicis étranger, has been described as semi-autobiographical. Brett and Lola share the same initials, and both worked as music journalists in the 1960s.
