= Deaths in November 2001 =

The following is a list of notable deaths in November 2001.

Entries for each day are listed alphabetically by surname. A typical entry lists information in the following sequence:

- Name, age, country of citizenship at birth, subsequent country of citizenship (if applicable), reason for notability, cause of death (if known), and reference.

== November 2001 ==
=== 1 ===
- Warren Amling, 76, American college basketball and football player (Ohio State Buckeyes).
- Juan Bosch, 92, Dominican politician, historian, and first president of the Dominican Republic, respiratory distress.
- Solange Chaput-Rolland, 82, Canadian journalist, author, and politician.
- Tom Cheney, 67, American Major League Baseball player (St. Louis Cardinals, Pittsburgh Pirates, Washington Senators).
- Olivia Hamnett, 73, English actress, brain cancer.
- Ravindra Kaushik, 49, Indian spy, heart disease, tuberculosis.
- JP Miller, 81, American writer, pneumonia.
- John S. Romanides, 74, Roman theologian, Eastern Orthodox priest, and scholar.
- Don Craig Wiley, 57, American structural biologist, drowned.

=== 2 ===
- Fiorella Betti, 74, Italian actress and voice actress.
- Gordie Byers, 71, Canadian ice hockey player (Boston Bruins).
- Mona Fandey, 45, Malaysian pop singer and convicted murderer, execution by hanging.
- Hank Gremminger, 68, American gridiron football player (Baylor, Green Bay Packers, Los Angeles Rams), cardiac arrest.
- Doug Hele, 82, British motorcycle engineer.
- Paula Kann, 79, Austrian-born American Olympic alpine skier (1948).
- Thomas Schleicher, 28, Austrian judoka and Olympian (1996), suicide.
- Elazar Shach, 102, Lithuanian haredi rabbi.
- Buddy Starcher, 95, American country singer.
- William Whitlock, 83, British politician.

=== 3 ===
- Evan Adermann, 74, Australian politician.
- Thomas Brasch, 56, German author, poet and film director, heart failure.
- Lucio Colletti, 76, Italian Western marxist philosopher.
- Denis Gallagher, 79, Irish politician.
- Ernst Gombrich, 92, Austrian-British art historian.
- Frederick Heyliger, 85, American officer with Easy Company during World War II.
- Pradeep Kumar, 76, Indian actor.
- László Móra, 66, Hungarian Olympic equestrian (1960, 1972).
- Liv Paulsen, 75, Norwegian Olympic athlete (1948).
- Mariano Navarro Rubio, 87, Spanish politician.
- Viveka Seldahl, 57, Swedish actress, cancer.
- Ward Wood, 77, American actor (Mannix) and television writer.

=== 4 ===
- Edward Patrick Boland, 90, American politician, member of the United States House of Representatives (1953-1989).
- Peter Coyne, 84, Australian politician.
- Bob Gillespie, 82, American baseball player (Detroit Tigers, Chicago White Sox, Boston Red Sox).
- Arthur Guepe, 86, American football player and coach.
- Paul R. Screvane, 87, American politician, congestive heart failure.
- Ng Eng Teng, 67, Singaporean sculptor, kidney disease.

=== 5 ===
- Gholam Reza Azhari, 89, Prime Minister of Iran and military leader, cancer.
- Andrew Bagby, 28, American doctor, murder by shooting.
- Milan D. Bish, 72, American diplomat (Ambassador of the United States to Barbados, Dominica, St Lucia, Antigua, and St. Vincent).
- Roy Boulting, 87, English filmmaker.
- Milton William Cooper, 58, American conspiracy theorist, radio broadcaster, and author, shot.
- Barry Horne, 49, English animal rights activist, liver failure after hunger strike.
- Joan Marion, 93, British stage, film and television actress.

=== 6 ===
- Terry D. Clark, 45, American convicted murderer, execution by lethal injection.
- Svend Engedal, 73, American soccer goalkeeper and Olympian (1956).
- Bettie Hewes, 80, Canadian politician.
- Don Lavoie, 50, American economist, stroke.
- Sveto Letica, 75, Croatian admiral.
- Gray Morrow, 67, American comic book artist (Man-Thing, El Diablo, Tarzan).
- Peter Kenneth Newman, 73, English economist and historian of economic thought.
- Anthony Shaffer, 75, English playwright (Sleuth) and screenwriter (The Wicker Man, Frenzy).
- Ralph Wenzel, 83, American gridiron football player (Pittsburgh Steelers), and United States Marine Corps officer.
- Erich Zeller, 81, German figure skater and figure skating coach.

=== 7 ===
- Shahed Ali, 76, Bangladeshi educationist, cultural activist and an author.
- Bobby Bass, 65, American stunt performer.
- Nida Blanca, 65, Filipino actress, stabbed.
- Delia Garcés, 82, Argentine film actress.
- Sachiko Hidari, 71, Japanese film actress, lung cancer.
- Geoffrey Jenkins, 81, South African writer.
- Sir Ivan Neill, 95, British Army officer and Unionist politician.
- François Philippe, 71, French Olympic football player (1960).
- Alta Schrock, 90, American biology professor and community activist.

=== 8 ===
- Paolo Bertoli, 93, Italian cardinal, camerlengo of the Holy Roman Church.
- Anno Birkin, 20, English poet and musician, road accident.
- Valentin Eduque, 74, Filipino basketball coach and player.
- Harold Fisch, 78, British-Israeli author, literary critic, and diplomat, tumor.
- Albrecht Fröhlich, 85, German-British mathematician.
- Malak Karsh, 86, Canadian photographer.
- Dimitar Kotev, 60, Bulgarian cyclist and Olympian (1960).
- Peter Laslett, 85, British historian.
- Patrick Quinlan, 81, Irish academic and politician.
- Radmila Savićević, 75, Serbian actress.
- Cyril Morley Shelford, 80, Canadian author and political figure.
- Stanislav Štrunc, 59, Czech football player and Olympian (1968).
- Raúl Zumbano, 76, Brazilian Olympic boxer (1948).

=== 9 ===
- Denis Atkinson, 75, Barbadian cricketer, captain of West Indies.
- Witold Balcerowski, 66, Polish chess player.
- Nancye Wynne Bolton, 84, Australian tennis player.
- Pino Canessa, 93, Italian Olympic sailor (1948).
- Dorothy Dunnett, 78, Scottish historical novelist.
- Ethel D. Jacobs, 91, American thoroughbred racehorse owner/breeder, pneumonia.
- Giovanni Leone, 93, Italian politician, Prime Minister (1963;1968) and President (1971–1978).
- Édouard Marcelle, 92, French Olympic rower (1928).
- Tore Zetterholm, 86, Swedish novelist, playwright and journalist.

=== 10 ===
- Michael Lucas, 2nd Baron Lucas of Chilworth, 75, British politician.
- Theys Eluay, 64, Indonesian independence activist for West Papuan, assassinated, strangling.
- Mariya Havrysh, 70, Soviet Ukrainian swimmer and Olympian (1952).
- Maxwell Hunter, 79, American aerospace engineer.
- Ken Kesey, 66, American author (One Flew Over the Cuckoo's Nest, Sometimes a Great Notion), complications following surgery.
- Enid McElwee, 87, New Zealand fencer.
- Junji Nishime, 80, Japanese politician.
- Hilbert Van Dijk, 83, Dutch-born Australian Olympic fencer (1956).

=== 11 ===
- John R. Foley, 84, American politician (U.S. Representative for Maryland's 6th congressional district from 1959 to 1961).
- Leon Gray, 49, American gridiron football player (Jackson State, New England Patriots, Houston Oilers, New Orleans Saints).
- Cliff Hansen, 91, American football player (Chicago Cardinals).
- Sir Denis Spotswood, 85, British Chief of the Air Staff (1971–1974)
- Tadashi Sugiura, 66, Japanese baseball player.
- Emmanuel Blayo Wakhweya, 64, Ugandan politician and economist, cardiac arrest.
- Journalists killed in the Dasht-e Qaleh Taliban ambush
  - Pierre Billaud, 31, French radio reporter and journalist.
  - Volker Handloik, 40, German freelance journalist and reporter.
  - Johanne Sutton, 34, French radio reporter and journalist.

=== 12 ===
- Henrique Callado, 81, Portuguese Olympic equestrian (1948, 1952, 1956, 1960, 1964).
- Carrie Donovan, 73, American fashion editor (Vogue, Harper's Bazaar, The New York Times Magazine).
- Albert Hague, 81, German-American composer (Redhead, How the Grinch Stole Christmas) and actor (Fame, Space Jam), cancer.
- Paul Krasny, 66, American film and television director.
- Ashot Melikjanyan, 49, Soviet/Armenian actor, plane crash.
- Tony Miles, 46, English chess grandmaster, heart failure.
- Babik Reinhardt, 57, French guitarist, heart attack.
- Prekshya Shah, 49, Nepalese princess, helicopter crash.
- Sivaya Subramuniyaswami, 74, American Saivite guru.
- Radovan Vlajković, 77, Yugoslav politician.

=== 13 ===
- Qazi Ashfaq, 33, Pakistani footballer.
- Karuna Banerjee, 81, Indian actress.
- Bob Eckhardt, 88, American politician (U.S. Representative for Texas's 8th congressional district from 1967 to 1981).
- Marius Flothuis, 87, Dutch composer, musicologist and music critic.
- Panama Francis, 82, American swing jazz drummer, stroke.
- Sam Maple, 48, American jockey in thoroughbred horse racing, cancer.
- Pat McReavy, 83, Canadian ice hockey player (Boston Bruins, Detroit Red Wings).
- Frank Messer, 76, American sportscaster.
- Peggy Mount, 86, English actress (Oliver!, The Princess and the Goblin).
- Mayzod Reid, 73, New Zealand diver.
- J. Harold Smith, 91, American pastor and evangelist.
- Cornelius Warmerdam, 86, American pole vaulter, Alzheimer's disease.

=== 14 ===
- Seth Benardete, 71, American classicist and philosopher.
- Paul Bochenwich, 76, American Olympic rower (1952).
- Charlotte Coleman, 33, British actress (Four Weddings and a Funeral), bronchial asthma attack.
- Henk Dijk, 81, Dutch Olympic wrestler (1948).
- Juan Carlos Lorenzo, 79, Argentine football player and coach.
- Zigu Ornea, 71, Romanian literary critic, biographer and book publisher, failed surgery.
- Franz Potucek, 74, Austrian Olympic ice hockey player (1956).
- Nathan M. Pusey, 94, American university educator.
- Herbert Tauss, 72, American artist, illustrator, and painter.
- Hugh Verity, 83, British Royal Air Force fighter pilot during World War II.

=== 15 ===
- Megan Boyd, 86, British fly tyer.
- Edwin H. Colbert, 96, American paleontologist, researcher and author.
- Herbert Feith, 71, Australian academic and scholar.
- Frances Hawkins, 79, American politician and teacher.
- Satoru Kobayashi, 71, Japanese film director, bladder cancer.
- Mandan Mishra, 72, Indian sanskrit scholar.
- Lewis Render Morgan, 88, American judge.
- Jan Rabie, 81, Afrikaans writer of short stories and novels.
- Nicolas Ruwet, 68, Belgian linguist, literary critic and musical analyst.
- Alberto Ullastres, 87, Spanish politician and ambassador.

=== 16 ===
- Tal Abernathy, 80, American baseball player (Philadelphia Athletics).
- Mohammed Atef, 57, Egyptian jihadist and military chief of al-Qaeda, airstrike.
- Rosemary Brown, 85, British composer and spiritualist.
- Tommy Flanagan, 71, American jazz pianist, brain aneurysm.
- Montague Jayawickrama, 90, Sri Lankan politician.
- Clifford A. Jones, 89, American politician.
- Red Steiner, 86, American baseball player (Cleveland Indians, Boston Red Sox).

=== 17 ===
- Irving Crane, 88, American pool player.
- John M. Dawson, 71, American computational physicist.
- Jerry Jerome, 89, American jazz and big band tenor saxophonist (Glenn Miller, Red Norvo, Benny Goodman, Artie Shaw).
- Michael Karoli, 53, German guitarist, singer, violinist and cellist (Can), cancer.
- Lendon Smith, 80, American pediatrician, author, and television personality.
- Billy Vessels, 70, American football player (Oklahoma Sooners, Baltimore Colts).
- Harrison A. Williams, 81, American politician.

=== 18 ===
- Mel Deutsch, 86, American baseball player (Boston Red Sox).
- Roar Hauglid, 90, Norwegian art historian, antiquarian and publicist.
- Malcolm McFee, 52, English actor, cancer.
- Christian Palant, 80, French Olympic modern pentathlete (1948, 1952).
- Ela Peroci, 79, Slovene children's book writer.
- Renato Righetto, 80, Brazilian Olympic basketball referee, Alzheimer's disease.
- Harriette Tarler, 81, American film actress.

=== 19 ===
- Baghdasar Arzoumanian, 85, Armenian architect and designer.
- Roland Beamont, 81, British fighter pilot for the Royal Air Force.
- Marylise Ben-Haim, 73, Algerian activist, novelist, poet, and painter.
- Marcelle Ferron, 77, Canadian Québécoise artist and a member of Les Automatistes.
- Shosh Kormosh, 53, Israeli photographer.
- Jens Reimers, 60, German discus thrower and Olympian (1968).
- John Sleaver, 67, Canadian ice hockey player (Chicago Black Hawks).
- Bagrat Ulubabyan, 75, Armenian writer and historian.
- Journalists killed in the Pul-i-Estikam bridge ambush
  - Harry Burton, 33, Australian journalist and cameraman.
  - Maria Grazia Cutuli, 39, Italian journalist.
  - Julio Fuentes, 46, Spanish war correspondent.
  - Aziz Ullah Haidari, 33, Pakistani correspondent and photo-journalist.

=== 20 ===
- James Broad, 43, American heavyweight boxer.
- Kassi Manlan, 53, Côte d'Ivoire World Health Organization aid worker, murdered.
- Pierre Meillassoux, 73, French architect.
- Leonard Murray, 88, American railroad executive.
- Borko Temelkovski, 81, Macedonian politician and communist leader.

=== 21 ===
- David Owen Belew Jr., 81, American district judge (United States District Court for the Northern District of Texas).
- Ralph Burns, 79, American jazz pianist, composer, and arranger, complications of a stroke and pneumonia.
- Seydou Keïta, Malian photographer.
- Gardner McKay, 69, American actor (Adventures in Paradise), artist and author, prostate cancer.
- Vladimir Pasechnik, 64, Soviet bioweaponeer and defector, stroke.
- Seymour Reit, 83, American children's author.
- Salahuddin of Selangor, 77, Malaysian king (11th Yang di-Pertuan Agong of Malaysia and 8th Sultan of Selangor).

=== 22 ===
- Mary Kay Ash, 83, American businesswoman, founder of Mary Kay Cosmetics.
- Theo Barker, 78, British social and economic historian.
- Norman Granz, 83, American jazz music impresario and record producer.
- Ronald Cuthbert Hay, 85, British Royal Marine fighter ace.
- George S. N. Luckyj, 82, Ukrainian writer and historian.
- Judge Owens, 85, American baseball player.
- Luis Santaló, 90, Spanish mathematician.

=== 23 ===
- Vendramino Bariviera, 64, Italian racing cyclist and Olympian (1960).
- Bo Belinsky, 64, American baseball player, heart attack.
- Jo van den Hoven, 90, Dutch footballer.
- Kiyoshi Inoue, 87, Japanese historian, author, and academic.
- Krishnananda, 79, Indian Hindu philosopher and theologian.
- David Charles McClintock, 88, English botanist, horticulturist and author.
- Medhat Youssef Mohamed, 74, Egyptian basketball player and Olympian (1948, 1952).
- Toon de Ruiter, 66, Dutch Olympic rower (1960).
- Kiril Semov, 71, Bulgarian Olympic basketball player (1952).
- O. C. Smith, 69, American singer ("Little Green Apples").
- Gerhard Stoltenberg, 73, German politician and minister.
- Mary Whitehouse, 91, British campaigner against permissiveness.

=== 24 ===
- Tommy Gallacher, 79, Scottish football player.
- Rachel Gurney, 81, British actress (Upstairs, Downstairs).
- Princess Sophie of Greece and Denmark, 87, European royalty, sister of Prince Philip.
- Robert Helps, 73, American concert pianist and composer, cancer.
- Jacob Landau, 83, American artist.
- Donald McPherson, 56, Canadian Olympic figure skater (1960), complications from diabetes.
- Francis Daniels Moore, 88, American surgeon.
- Bud O'Rourke, 82, American basketball player.
- Melanie Thornton, 34, American singer, plane crash.
- William Woodfield, 73, American photographer, and television screenwriter and producer, heart failure.

=== 25 ===
- Alan Bray, 53, British historian and gay rights activist, AIDS-related complications.
- Harry Devlin, 83, American artist, painter and magazine cartoonist (Collier's).
- David Gascoyne, 85, English poet (Surrealist movement).
- Douglas Morton, 85, Canadian soldier, politician, and judge.
- Joel Ramqvist, 92, Swedish Olympic canoeist (1936).
- Margaret Byrd Rawson, 102, American educator, researcher and writer.
- Johnny Micheal Spann, 32, American operations officer in the C.I.A., killed in action.
- Erna Steuri, 84, Swiss Olympic alpine skier (1936).

=== 26 ===
- Sam Claphan, 45, American gridiron football player (San Diego Chargers), heart attack.
- Mathias Clemens, 86, Luxembourgish road bicycle racer.
- Regine Hildebrandt, 60, German biologist and politician (Social Democratic Party of Germany), breast cancer.
- Lajos Kada, 77, Hungarian prelate of the Roman Catholic Church.
- Joe Modise, 72, South African political activist, cancer.
- Edel Randem, 91, Norwegian Olympic figure skater (1928).
- Ulf Strömberg, 42, Swedish cameraman, rifle shots.
- Nils-Aslak Valkeapää, 58, Finnish-Sami writer, musician, and artist.
- Grete von Zieritz, 102, Austrian-German composer and pianist.

=== 27 ===
- Joseph Donovan, 52, Australian Olympic boxer (1968).
- Ray Frankowski, 82, American gridiron football player (Green Bay Packers, Los Angeles Dons).
- Gordon Freeth, 87, Australian politician (House of Representatives) and diplomat (Japan, United Kingdom).
- Paul Hume, 85, American music critic and author.
- Marguerite Nicolas, 85, French Olympic high jumper (1936).
- Harry Sternberg, 97, American painter and printmaker.
- Paul Theisen, 79, Danish Olympic fencer (1952).
- Joe Hin Tjio, 82, American cytogeneticist.
- Jane Welsh, 96, British actress.

=== 28 ===
- Louis Fisher, 88, American politician (Socialist Labor Party of America).
- Gunnar Hellström, 72, Swedish actor and director.
- Stanisław Kowal, 73, Polish Olympic triple jumper (1952).
- Gleb Lozino-Lozinskiy, 91, Soviet and Ukrainian aerospace engineer.
- Norman Lumsden, 95, British opera singer and actor, shingles infection.
- Kal Mann, 84, American lyricist ("Teddy Bear", "Butterfly", "Let's Twist Again").
- Jan Nicolaas, 89, Dutch Olympic boxer (1936).
- Henryk Nowara, 77, Polish Olympic boxer (1952).
- Robert Nusser, 90, Austrian Olympic ice hockey player (1956).
- William Reid, 79, Scottish bomber pilot and war hero (Victoria Cross) during World War II.
- Igor Stechkin, 79, Russian small arms designer.
- Philip Willis Tone, 78, American judge.

=== 29 ===
- Viktor Astafyev, 77, Soviet and Russian writer.
- Usman Awang, 72, Malaysian poet, playwright, and novelist, heart attack.
- Budd Boetticher, 85, American film director (seven westerns starring Randolph Scott).
- Elta Cartwright, 93, American Olympic sprinter (1928).
- Mic Christopher, 32, Irish singer-songwriter, accidental fall.
- Carol Goodner, 97, American actress.
- George Harrison, 58, British singer-songwriter and musician (The Beatles), lung cancer.
- Werner Hausmann, 78, Swiss Olympic field hockey player (1960).
- John Knowles, 75, American author, A Separate Peace.
- Marcelino López, 58, Cuban-American baseball player.
- John Mitchum, 82, American character actor (Dirty Harry series, Telefon, F Troop), stroke.
- Helvio Soto Soto, 71, Chilean filmmaker.
- Erwin Thaler, 71, Austrian Olympic bobsledder (1964, 1968).

=== 30 ===
- Kikutaro Baba, 96, Japanese malacologist.
- Jorge Bedoya, 72, Argentine Olympic equestrian (1968).
- Annibale Brasola, 76, Italian racing cyclist.
- Francisco Calvet, 80, Spanish football player.
- Lawrence Coughlin, 72, American lawyer and politician (U.S. Representative for Pennsylvania's 13th congressional district, 1969–1993), cancer.
- Sergio Ferriani, 76, Italian Olympic basketball player (1948, 1952).
- Ernst Hufschmid, 88, Swiss footballer.
- Ademar Miranda Júnior, 60, Brazilian football player.
- Käthe Köhler, 88, German Olympic diver (1936).
- Boris Kuzmin, 60, Soviet Russian rower and Olympian (1964).
- František Majdloch, 72, Czech Olympic boxer (1948, 1952, 1956).
- George Tajirian, 60, Iraqi Olympic cyclist (1968).
- Walt Zirinsky, 81, American football player (Cleveland Rams).
