= November 11 =

November 11 this year in various calendars
- Wednesday, 11 November 2026
Akan	Kwawukuo
Armenian	24 Trē 1476
Aztec	Atlcahualo 20, 7 Ācatl
Babylonian	29 Tashritu, 2337 SE
Balinese pawukon	Menga, Beteng, Jaya, Paing, Was, Buda of Landep, Guru, Tulus, Manusa
Bengali	26 Kartik, BS 1433
Chinese	Yin Earth Ox・Chariot Mansion; Fire Horse Year, Month 10, Day 3 (Lidong, 11 days until Xiaoxue)
Common Era	11 November 2026 CE
Coptic	2 Hathor, AM 1743
Egyptian	29 Phamenoth, 2775 NE
Ethiopian	2 H̱edār, 2019 Amätä Məhrät
French Republican	Décade II, Décadi de Brumaire de l'Année 235 de la République
Gregorian	11 November, AD 2026
Hebrew	1 Kislev, AM 5787
Hindu	Anurādhā・Śobhana; Solar: 25 Kārtika, 1948 SE; Lunisolar: Dvitīyā, Śukla pakṣa of Kārtika, 2083 VE; Rāudra・5127 KY・1,872,890
Icelandic	Miðvikudagur, 19 Gormánuður 2026
Islamic	30 Jumada al-awwal, AH 1448 (using tabular method)
ISO week date	2026-W46-3
Japanese	3 Kannazuki, Reiwa 8 (Rittō, 11 days until Shōsetsu)
Julian	29 October, AD 2026 (AM 7535)
Julian day	2461356
Korean	3 Dwaejidal, 4359 DE
Maya	13.0.14.1.13; 6 Ceh, 7 Ben
Roman	ante diem IV Kalendas Novembres, MMDCCLXXIX AUC
Solar Hijri	20 Aban, SH 1405
Tibetan	2 smin drug, me pho rta 2153 or 1772 or 1000

<<	November					>>
Su	Mo	Tu	We	Th	Fr	Sa
1	2	3	4	5	6	7
8	9	10	11	12	13	14
15	16	17	18	19	20	21
22	23	24	25	26	27	28
29	30
2026

November 11 in recent years
2026 (Wednesday)
2025 (Tuesday)
2024 (Monday)
2023 (Saturday)
2022 (Friday)
2021 (Thursday)
2020 (Wednesday)
2019 (Monday)
2018 (Sunday)
2017 (Saturday)

November 11 is the 315th day of the year (316th in leap years) in the Gregorian calendar; 50 days remain until the end of the year.

== Events ==
=== Pre-1600 ===
- 109 – Roman emperor Trajan celebrates his newly constructed naumachia with a display of ships and mock battles.
- 308 – At Carnuntum, Emperor emeritus Diocletian confers with Galerius, Augustus of the East, and Maximianus, the recently returned former Augustus of the West, in an attempt to end the civil wars of the Tetrarchy.
- 1028 – Constantine VIII dies, ending his uninterrupted reign as emperor or co-emperor of the Byzantine Empire of 66 years.
- 1100 – Henry I of England marries Matilda of Scotland, the daughter of Malcolm III of Scotland and a direct descendant of the Saxon king Edmund Ironside; Matilda is crowned on the same day.
- 1215 – The Fourth Council of the Lateran meets, defining the doctrine of transubstantiation, the process by which bread and wine are, by that doctrine, said to transform into the body and blood of Christ.
- 1417 – The election of pope Martin V at the Council of Constance ends the Western Schism.
- 1500 – Treaty of Granada: Louis XII of France and Ferdinand II of Aragon agree to divide the Kingdom of Naples between them.
- 1572 – Tycho Brahe observes the supernova SN 1572.

=== 1601–1900 ===
- 1606 – The peace treaty of Zsitvatorok ends the Long Turkish War between the Habsburg and the Ottoman empires. It stabilises the borderlands in Hungary and the Ottoman Sultan recognises the Holy Roman Emperor as his equal.
- 1620 – The Mayflower Compact is signed in what is now Provincetown Harbor near Cape Cod.
- 1634 – Following pressure from Anglican bishop John Atherton, the Irish House of Commons passes An Act for the Punishment for the Vice of Buggery.
- 1673 – Second Battle of Khotyn in Ukraine: Polish–Lithuanian Commonwealth forces under the command of Jan Sobieski defeat the Ottoman army. In this battle, rockets made by Kazimierz Siemienowicz are successfully used.
- 1675 – Gottfried Leibniz demonstrates integral calculus for the first time to find the area under the graph of y = ƒ(x).
- 1688 – The Dutch invasion fleet of William of Orange departs from the Dutch Republic for the second time, beginning the 1688 invasion of England.
- 1724 – Joseph Blake, alias Blueskin, a highwayman known for attacking "Thief-Taker General" (and thief) Jonathan Wild at the Old Bailey, is hanged in London.
- 1750 – Riots break out in Lhasa after the murder of the Tibetan regent.
- 1750 – The F.H.C. Society, also known as the Flat Hat Club, is formed at Raleigh Tavern, Williamsburg, Virginia. It is the first college fraternity.
- 1778 – Cherry Valley massacre: Loyalists and Seneca Indian forces attack a fort and village in eastern New York during the American Revolutionary War, killing more than forty civilians and soldiers.
- 1805 – Napoleonic Wars: Battle of Dürenstein: Eight thousand French troops attempt to slow the retreat of a vastly superior Russian and Austrian force.
- 1813 – War of 1812: Battle of Crysler's Farm: British and Canadian forces defeat a larger American force, causing the Americans to abandon their Saint Lawrence campaign.
- 1831 – In Jerusalem, Virginia, Nat Turner is hanged after inciting a violent slave uprising.
- 1839 – The Virginia Military Institute is founded in Lexington, Virginia.
- 1855 – A powerful earthquake occurs in Edo, Japan, causing considerable damage in the Kantō region from the shaking and subsequent fires. It had a death toll of 7,000–10,000 people and destroyed around 14,000 buildings.
- 1865 – Treaty of Sinchula is signed whereby Bhutan cedes the areas east of the Teesta River to the British East India Company.
- 1869 – The Victorian Aboriginal Protection Act is enacted in Australia, giving the government control of indigenous people's wages, their terms of employment, where they could live, and of their children, effectively leading to the Stolen Generations.
- 1889 – The State of Washington is admitted as the 42nd state of the United States.

=== 1901–present ===
- 1911 – Many cities in the Midwestern United States break their record highs and lows on the same day as a strong cold front rolls through.
- 1918 – World War I: Germany signs an armistice agreement with the Allies in a railroad car in the forest of Compiègne.
- 1918 – Józef Piłsudski assumes supreme military power in Poland – symbolic first day of Polish independence.
- 1918 – Emperor Charles I of Austria relinquishes power.
- 1919 – The Industrial Workers of the World attack an Armistice Day parade in Centralia, Washington, ultimately resulting in the deaths of five people.
- 1919 – Latvian forces defeat the West Russian Volunteer Army at Riga in the Latvian War of Independence.
- 1921 – The Tomb of the Unknowns is dedicated by U.S. President Warren G. Harding at Arlington National Cemetery.
- 1923 – Adolf Hitler is arrested in Munich for high treason for his role in the Beer Hall Putsch.
- 1926 – The United States Numbered Highway System is established.
- 1930 – Patent number US1781541 is awarded to Albert Einstein and Leó Szilárd for their invention, the Einstein refrigerator.
- 1934 – The Shrine of Remembrance is opened in Melbourne, Australia.
- 1940 – World War II: In the Battle of Taranto, the Royal Navy launches the first all-aircraft ship-to-ship naval attack in history.
- 1940 – World War II: The German auxiliary cruiser Atlantis captures top secret British mail from the Automedon, and sends it to Japan.
- 1942 – World War II: France's zone libre is occupied by German forces in Case Anton.
- 1942 – The Turkish parliament passes the Varlık Vergisi, a capital tax mostly levied on non-Muslim citizens with the unofficial aim to inflict financial ruin on them and end their prominence in the country's economy.
- 1949 – The People's Liberation Army Air Force is founded.
- 1960 – A military coup against President Ngô Đình Diệm of South Vietnam is crushed.
- 1961 – Thirteen Italian Air Force servicemen, deployed to the Congo as a part of the UN peacekeeping force, are massacred by a mob in Kindu.
- 1962 – Kuwait's National Assembly ratifies the Constitution of Kuwait.
- 1965 – Southern Rhodesia's Prime Minister Ian Smith unilaterally declares the colony independent as the unrecognised state of Rhodesia.
- 1965 – United Air Lines Flight 227 crashes at Salt Lake City International Airport, killing 43.
- 1966 – NASA launches Gemini 12.
- 1967 – Vietnam War: In a propaganda ceremony in Phnom Penh, Cambodia, three American prisoners of war are released by the Viet Cong and turned over to "new left" antiwar activist Tom Hayden.
- 1968 – Vietnam War: Operation Commando Hunt initiated. The goal is to interdict men and supplies on the Ho Chi Minh trail, through Laos into South Vietnam.
- 1972 – Vietnam War: Vietnamization: The United States Army turns over the massive Long Binh military base to South Vietnam.
- 1975 – Australian constitutional crisis of 1975: Australian Governor-General Sir John Kerr dismisses the government of Gough Whitlam, appoints Malcolm Fraser as caretaker Prime Minister and announces a general election to be held in early December.
- 1975 – Independence of Angola.
- 1977 – A munitions explosion at a train station in Iri, South Korea kills at least 56 people.
- 1981 – Antigua and Barbuda joins the United Nations.
- 1982 – Space Shuttle Columbia launches from the Kennedy Space Center on STS-5, the first operational mission of the Space Shuttle program.
- 1992 – The General Synod of the Church of England votes to allow women to become priests.
- 1993 – A sculpture honoring women who served in the Vietnam War is dedicated at the Vietnam Veterans Memorial in Washington, D.C.
- 1999 – The House of Lords Act is given Royal Assent, restricting membership of the British House of Lords by virtue of a hereditary peerage.
- 2000 – Kaprun disaster: One hundred fifty-five skiers and snowboarders die when a cable car catches fire in an alpine tunnel in Kaprun, Austria.
- 2001 – Journalists Pierre Billaud, Johanne Sutton and Volker Handloik are killed in Afghanistan during an attack on the convoy they are traveling in.
- 2002 – A Fokker F27 Friendship operating as Laoag International Airlines Flight 585 crashes into Manila Bay shortly after takeoff from Ninoy Aquino International Airport, killing 19 people.
- 2002 – Russian mathematician Grigori Perelman posts the first of three preprint texts with his proof of the Poincaré conjecture. It remains the only Millennium Prize Problem in mathematics to be solved. He later refused both the prize money from the Clay Mathematics Institute as well as the Fields Medal for his work.
- 2004 – New Zealand Tomb of the Unknown Warrior is dedicated at the National War Memorial, Wellington.
- 2004 – The Palestine Liberation Organization confirms the death of Yasser Arafat from unidentified causes. Mahmoud Abbas is elected chairman of the PLO minutes later.
- 2006 – Queen Elizabeth II unveils the New Zealand War Memorial in London, United Kingdom, commemorating the loss of soldiers from the New Zealand Army and the British Army.
- 2008 – After 30 years in power, Maumoon Abdul Gayoom was succeeded by Mohamed Nasheed as the president of the Maldives.
- 2011 – A helicopter crash just outside Mexico City kills seven, including Francisco Blake Mora the Secretary of the Interior of Mexico.
- 2012 – A strong earthquake with the magnitude 6.8 hits northern Burma, killing at least 26 people.
- 2020 – Typhoon Vamco makes landfall in Luzon and several offshore islands, killing 67 people. The storm causes the worst floods in the region since Typhoon Ketsana in 2009.
- 2022 – Russo-Ukrainian War: Ukrainian armed forces enter the city of Kherson following a successful two-month southern counteroffensive.
- 2024 – A vehicle-ramming attack in Zhuhai, China, kills 38 people and injures 48.
- 2026 - The historic ocean liner SS United States is sunk off the coast of Destin, Florida, to become the world's largest artificial reef.

== Births ==
=== Pre-1600 ===
- 1050 – Henry IV, Holy Roman Emperor (died 1106)
- 1154 – Sancho I of Portugal (died 1212)
- 1155 – Alfonso VIII of Castile (died 1214)
- 1220 – Alphonse, Count of Poitiers (died 1271)
- 1430 – Jošt of Rožmberk, Bishop of Breslau (died 1467)
- 1441 – Charlotte of Savoy, French queen (died 1483)
- 1449 – Catherine of Poděbrady, Hungarian queen (died 1464)
- 1491 – Martin Bucer, German Protestant reformer (died 1551)
- 1493 – Paracelsus, Swiss-German physician, botanist, astrologer, and occultist (died 1541)
- 1512 – Marcin Kromer, Prince-Bishop of Warmia (died 1589)
- 1569 – Martin Ruland the Younger, German physician and chemist (died 1611)
- 1579 – Frans Snyders, Flemish painter (died 1657)
- 1599 – Maria Eleonora of Brandenburg (died 1655)
- 1599 – Ottavio Piccolomini, Austrian-Italian field marshal (died 1656)

=== 1601–1900 ===
- 1633 – George Savile, 1st Marquess of Halifax, English politician, Lord President of the Council (died 1695)
- 1668 – Johann Albert Fabricius, German author and scholar (died 1736)
- 1696 – Andrea Zani, Italian violinist and composer (died 1757)
- 1743 – Carl Peter Thunberg, Swedish botanist, entomologist, and psychologist (died 1828)
- 1748 – Charles IV of Spain (died 1819)
- 1768 – Sikandar Jah, (died 1829) 3rd Nizam of Hyderabad State
- 1791 – Josef Munzinger, Swiss lawyer and politician, 3rd President of the Swiss Confederation (died 1855)
- 1821 – Fyodor Dostoevsky, Russian novelist, short story writer, essayist, and philosopher (died 1881)
- 1836 – Thomas Bailey Aldrich, American poet and author (died 1907)
- 1852 – Franz Conrad von Hötzendorf, Austrian-Hungarian field marshal (died 1925)
- 1855 – Stevan Sremac, Serbian author and activist (died 1906)
- 1857 – Janet Erskine Stuart, English nun and educator (died 1914)
- 1860 – Thomas Joseph Byrnes, Australian politician, 12th Premier of Queensland (died 1898)
- 1863 – Paul Signac, French painter and educator (died 1935)
- 1864 – George Washington Crile, American surgeon (conducted first direct blood transfusion, studied effects of surgical shock) (died 1943)
- 1864 – Alfred Hermann Fried, Austrian journalist and activist, Nobel Prize laureate (died 1921)
- 1866 – Martha Annie Whiteley, English chemist and mathematician (died 1956)
- 1867 – Shrimad Rajchandra, a Jain philosopher, spiritual mentor of Mahatma Gandhi (died 1901)
- 1868 – Édouard Vuillard, French painter and academic (died 1940)
- 1869 – Victor Emmanuel III of Italy (died 1947)
- 1869 – Gaetano Bresci, Italian anarchist assassin (died 1901)
- 1872 – Maude Adams, American actress (died 1953)
- 1872 – David I. Walsh, American lawyer and politician, 46th Governor of Massachusetts (died 1947)
- 1875 – Vesto Slipher, American astronomer, provided the first evidence to support the expanding-universe theory (died 1969)
- 1875 – Anscar Vonier, German Benedictine abbot in England (died 1938)
- 1882 – Gustaf VI Adolf of Sweden (died 1973)
- 1883 – Ernest Ansermet, Swiss conductor and academic (died 1969)
- 1885 – George S. Patton, American general (died 1945)
- 1887 – Roland Young, English-American actor (died 1953)
- 1888 – Abul Kalam Azad, Indian activist, scholar, and politician, Indian Minister of Education (died 1958)
- 1888 – J. B. Kripalani, Indian lawyer and politician (died 1982)
- 1891 – Rabbit Maranville, American baseball player and manager (died 1954)
- 1891 – Grunya Sukhareva, Ukrainian-Russian psychiatrist and university lecturer (died 1981)
- 1894 – Beverly Bayne, American actress (died 1982)
- 1895 – Wealthy Babcock, American mathematician and academic (died 1990)
- 1896 – Shirley Graham Du Bois, American author, playwright, composer, and activist (died 1977)
- 1896 – Carlos Eduardo Castañeda, Mexican-American historian (died 1958)
- 1898 – René Clair, French actor, director, producer, and screenwriter (died 1981)
- 1899 – Pat O'Brien, American actor (died 1983)
- 1900 – Maria Babanova, Russian stage and film actress (died 1983)

=== 1901–present ===
- 1901 – Sam Spiegel, American film producer (died 1985)
- 1901 – F. Van Wyck Mason, American historian and author (died 1978)
- 1903 – Isaac Bashevis Singer, Polish-American Yiddish writer (Yentl, Nobel Prize for Literature 1978) (died 1991)
- 1904 – Alger Hiss, American lawyer and convicted spy (died 1996)
- 1904 – J. H. C. Whitehead, British mathematician and academic (died 1960)
- 1906 – Brother Theodore, German-American monologuist and comedian (died 2001)
- 1907 – Joseph Gilbert Hamilton, studied effects of exposure to radioactive isotopes as part of 'Manhattan Project' (died 1957)
- 1907 – Orestis Laskos, Greek director, screenwriter, and poet (died 1992)
- 1909 – Robert Ryan, American actor (died 1973)
- 1909 – Piero Scotti, Italian race car driver (died 1976)
- 1910 – Raemer Schreiber, worked on the Manhattan Project during World War II to develop the first atomic bomb (died 1998)
- 1911 – Roberto Matta, Chilean-Italian painter and sculptor (died 2002)
- 1912 – Thomas C. Mann, American lawyer, politician, and diplomat, United States Ambassador to El Salvador (died 1999)
- 1914 – James Gilbert Baker, American astronomer, optician, and academic (died 2005)
- 1914 – Daisy Bates, American activist (died 1999)
- 1914 – Taslim Olawale Elias, Nigerian academic and jurist, 2nd Chief Justice of Nigeria (died 1991)
- 1914 – Howard Fast, American novelist and screenwriter (died 2003)
- 1914 – Henry Wade, American soldier and lawyer (died 2001)
- 1915 – William Proxmire, American soldier, journalist, and politician (died 2005)
- 1915 – Anna Schwartz, American economist and author (died 2012)
- 1916 – Robert Carr, English engineer and politician, Lord President of the Council (died 2012)
- 1918 – Stubby Kaye, American entertainer (died 1997)
- 1919 – Kalle Päätalo, Finnish soldier and author (died 2000)
- 1920 – Roy Jenkins, British politician, President of the European Commission (died 2003)
- 1920 – Walter Krupinski, German captain and pilot (died 2000)
- 1921 – Terrel Bell, American sergeant, academic, and politician, 2nd United States Secretary of Education (died 1996)
- 1922 – Kurt Vonnegut, American novelist, short story writer, and essayist (died 2007)
- 1925 – John Guillermin, English-American director, producer, and screenwriter (died 2015)
- 1925 – June Whitfield, English actress (died 2018)
- 1925 – Jonathan Winters, American actor and screenwriter (died 2013)
- 1926 – Maria Teresa de Filippis, Italian race car driver (died 2016)
- 1926 – Harry Lumley, Canadian ice hockey player (died 1998)
- 1927 – Mose Allison, American singer-songwriter and pianist (died 2016)
- 1927 – Martin Špegelj, Croatian general and politician, 2nd Croatian Minister of Defence (died 2014)
- 1928 – Ernestine Anderson, American singer (died 2016)
- 1928 – Carlos Fuentes, Mexican novelist and essayist (died 2012)
- 1928 – Edward Zorinsky, former mayor of Omaha, Nebraska (died 1987)
- 1929 – LaVern Baker, American singer (died 1997)
- 1929 – Hans Magnus Enzensberger, German author and poet (died 2022)
- 1929 – Martin Jacomb, English lawyer, businessman, and academic (died 2024)
- 1930 – Mildred Dresselhaus, American physicist and academic (died 2017)
- 1930 – Hugh Everett III, American physicist and mathematician (died 1982)
- 1930 – Hank Garland, American Nashville-based country, rock and jazz session guitar virtuoso ("Jingle Bell Rock") (died 2004)
- 1930 – Vernon Handley, English conductor (died 2008)
- 1932 – Germano Mosconi, Italian journalist (died 2012)
- 1933 – Martino Finotto, Italian race car driver (died 2014)
- 1933 – Peter B. Lewis, American businessman and philanthropist (died 2013)
- 1935 – Bibi Andersson, Swedish actress (died 2019)
- 1936 – Jack Keller, American songwriter and producer (died 2005)
- 1937 – Vittorio Brambilla, Italian race car driver (died 2001)
- 1937 – Rudy LaRusso, American basketball player (died 2004)
- 1937 – Stephen Lewis, Canadian politician and diplomat, 14th Canadian Ambassador to the United Nations (died 2026)
- 1937 – Alicia Ostriker, American poet and scholar
- 1939 – Denise Alexander, American actress (died 2025)
- 1940 – Barbara Boxer, American journalist and politician
- 1940 – Dennis Coffey, American guitarist
- 1942 – Jonathan Fenby, English journalist and businessman
- 1942 – Roy Fredericks, Guyanese-American cricketer and politician (died 2000)
- 1942 – K. Connie Kang, Korean American journalist and author (died 2019)
- 1942 – Diane Wolkstein, American author and radio host (died 2013)
- 1943 – Doug Frost, Australian swim coach
- 1945 – Chris Dreja, English guitarist and songwriter (died 2025)
- 1945 – Vince Martell, American singer and guitarist
- 1945 – Daniel Ortega, Nicaraguan politician, President of Nicaragua
- 1946 – Al Holbert, American race car driver (died 1988)
- 1947 – Elizabeth Glaser, American AIDS activist and child advocate (died 1994)
- 1948 – Andrzej Czok, Polish mountaineer (died 1986)
- 1948 – Robert John "Mutt" Lange, British-South African record producer and songwriter
- 1948 – Vincent Schiavelli, American actor (died 2005)
- 1949 – Ismail Petra of Kelantan (died 2019)
- 1949 – Kathy Postlewait, American golfer
- 1950 – Mircea Dinescu, Romanian journalist and poet
- 1950 – Jim Peterik, American singer-songwriter and guitarist
- 1951 – Kim Peek, American megasavant (died 2009)
- 1951 – Marc Summers, American television host and producer
- 1951 – Fuzzy Zoeller, American golfer (died 2025)
- 1952 – Sue Schechter, American politician, member of the Texas House of Representatives
- 1953 – Marshall Crenshaw, American singer-songwriter and guitarist
- 1953 – Andy Partridge, English singer-songwriter, guitarist, and record producer
- 1954 – Steve Brain, English rugby player
- 1954 – Mary Gaitskill, American novelist, essayist, and short story writer.
- 1954 – Jim Kabia, English footballer
- 1954 – Roger Slifer, American author, illustrator, screenwriter, and producer (died 2015)
- 1955 – Dave Alvin, American singer-songwriter and guitarist
- 1955 – Jigme Singye Wangchuk, King of Bhutan
- 1955 – Teri York, Canadian diver
- 1956 – Talat Aziz, Ghazal singer
- 1956 – Ian Craig Marsh, English guitarist
- 1958 – Luz Casal, Spanish singer-songwriter and actress
- 1958 – Kazimieras Černis, Lithuanian astronomer and astrophysicist
- 1958 – Carlos Lacámara, Cuban-American actor and playwright
- 1958 – Kathy Lette, Australian-English author
- 1959 – Lee Haney, American bodybuilder
- 1959 – Richard Rowe, English jockey and trainer
- 1959 – Christian Schwarzenegger, Swiss criminologist and academic
- 1959 – Carl Williams, American boxer (died 2013)
- 1960 – Colin Harvey, English author and critic (died 2011)
- 1960 – Chuck Hernandez, American baseball player and coach
- 1960 – Paquito Ochoa, Jr., Filipino lawyer and politician, 37th Executive Secretary of the Philippines
- 1960 – Cristina Odone, Kenyan-Italian journalist and author
- 1960 – Peter Parros, American actor, producer, and screenwriter
- 1960 – Stanley Tucci, American actor and director
- 1961 – Yuri Milner, Russian-born entrepreneur, venture capitalist and physicist
- 1962 – Mario Fenech, Maltese-Australian rugby league player and sportscaster
- 1962 – Georgios Mitsibonas, Greek footballer (died 1997)
- 1962 – Demi Moore, American actress, director, and producer
- 1962 – James Morrison, Australian trumpet player and composer
- 1963 – Billy Gunn, American wrestler and actor
- 1964 – Margarete Bagshaw, American painter and potter (died 2015)
- 1964 – Calista Flockhart, American actress
- 1964 – Philip McKeon, American actor (died 2019)
- 1965 – Max Mutchnick, American screenwriter and producer
- 1965 – Kim Stockwood, Canadian singer-songwriter
- 1966 – Benedicta Boccoli, Italian model and actress
- 1966 – Vince Colosimo, Australian actor
- 1966 – Alison Doody, Irish model and actress
- 1966 – Peaches, Canadian musician and producer
- 1967 – Gil de Ferran, Brazilian race car driver (died 2023)
- 1967 – David Doak, Northern Irish video game designer
- 1967 – Frank John Hughes, American actor, producer, and screenwriter
- 1968 – Diego Fuser, Italian footballer and manager
- 1969 – Carson Kressley, American fashion designer, television personality, and actor
- 1971 – David DeLuise, American actor and director
- 1971 – Tomas Pačėsas, Lithuanian basketball player and coach
- 1972 – Adam Beach, Canadian actor
- 1973 – Jason White, American singer-songwriter and guitarist
- 1974 – Jon B., American singer-songwriter and producer
- 1974 – Leonardo DiCaprio, American actor and producer
- 1974 – Static Major, American singer-songwriter and producer (died 2008)
- 1974 – Wajahatullah Wasti, Pakistani cricketer
- 1975 – Daisuke Ohata, Japanese rugby player
- 1976 – Jason Grilli, American baseball player
- 1976 – Jesse F. Keeler, Canadian bass player
- 1977 – Ben Hollioake, Australian-English cricketer (died 2002)
- 1977 – Jill Vedder, American philanthropist, activist and fashion model
- 1977 – Maniche, Portuguese footballer and manager
- 1977 – Scoot McNairy, American actor and producer
- 1977 – Marsha Mehran, Iranian-American author (died 2014)
- 1978 – Lou Vincent, New Zealand cricketer
- 1980 – Chris Kelly, Canadian ice hockey player
- 1980 – Nicole Malliotakis, American politician
- 1980 – Edmoore Takaendesa, Zimbabwean-German rugby player
- 1982 – Gonzalo Canale, Argentinian-Italian rugby player
- 1983 – Arouna Koné, Ivorian footballer
- 1983 – Philipp Lahm, German footballer
- 1983 – Tatsuhisa Suzuki, Japanese voice actor and singer
- 1984 – Stephen Hunt, English footballer
- 1984 – Birkir Már Sævarsson, Icelandic footballer
- 1985 – Osvaldo Alonso, Cuban footballer
- 1985 – Austin Collie, American football player
- 1985 – Tiidrek Nurme, Estonian runner
- 1985 – Jessica Sierra, American singer
- 1985 – Robin Uthappa, Indian cricketer
- 1986 – Jon Batiste, American singer and pianist
- 1986 – Victor Cruz, American football player
- 1986 – Mark Sanchez, American football player
- 1986 – François Trinh-Duc, French rugby player
- 1987 – Vinny Guadagnino, American actor
- 1987 – Chanelle Hayes, English model and singer
- 1988 – David Depetris, Argentinian-Slovak footballer
- 1988 – Mikako Komatsu, Japanese voice actress and singer
- 1988 – Kyle Naughton, English footballer
- 1989 – Nick Blackman, English-Israeli footballer
- 1989 – Joe Ragland, American basketball player
- 1989 – Adam Rippon, American figure skater
- 1989 – Reina Tanaka, Japanese singer
- 1989 – Lewis Williamson, Scottish race car driver
- 1990 – Tom Dumoulin, Dutch road bicycle racer
- 1990 – James Segeyaro, Papua New Guinean rugby league player
- 1990 – Georginio Wijnaldum, Dutch footballer
- 1991 – Christa B. Allen, American actress
- 1991 – Kaho Onodera, Japanese curler
- 1992 – Sofía Luini, Argentine tennis player
- 1992 – Jean-Gabriel Pageau, Canadian ice hockey player
- 1993 – Jamaal Lascelles, English footballer
- 1994 – Lio Rush, American wrestler
- 1994 – Sanju Samson, Indian cricketer
- 1994 – Ellie Simmonds, English swimmer
- 1995 – Josh Aloiai, New Zealand rugby league player
- 1995 – Yuriko Miyazaki, British tennis player
- 1995 – Shin Seung-ho, South Korean actor and model
- 1996 – Tye Sheridan, American actor and producer
- 1998 – Liudmila Samsonova, Russian tennis player
- 1999 – X González, American activist
- 1999 – Samara Joy, American jazz singer
- 2004 – Oakes Fegley, American actor
- 2005 – Ben Gannon-Doak, Scottish footballer

== Deaths ==
=== Pre-1600 ===
- 405 – Arsacius of Tarsus, Tarsian archbishop (born 324)
- 683 – Yazid I, Muslim caliph (born 647)
- 865 – Petronas, Byzantine general
- 865 – Antony the Younger, Byzantine monk and saint (born 785)
- 875 – Teutberga, queen of Lotharingia
- 1028 – Constantine VIII, Byzantine emperor (born 960)
- 1078 – Udo of Nellenburg, Archbishop of Trier (during the siege of Tübingen)
- 1089 – Peter Igneus, Italian Benedictine monk
- 1130 – Teresa of León, Countess of Portugal, Portuguese regent (born 1080)
- 1189 – King William II of Sicily ("the Good") (born 1153)
- 1285 – King Peter III of Aragon (born 1239)
- 1331 – Stefan Uroš III Dečanski of Serbia (born c. 1285)
- 1561 – Hans Tausen, Danish reformer (born 1494)
- 1583 – Gerald FitzGerald, 14th Earl of Desmond, Irish rebel

=== 1601–1900 ===
- 1623 – Philippe de Mornay, French theorist and author (born 1549)
- 1638 – Cornelis van Haarlem, Dutch painter and illustrator (born 1562)
- 1724 – Joseph Blake, English criminal (born 1700)
- 1812 – Platon Levshin, Russian metropolitan (born 1737)
- 1831 – Nat Turner, American slave and rebel leader (born 1800)
- 1855 – Søren Kierkegaard, Danish philosopher, author, and poet (born 1813)
- 1861 – Pedro V of Portugal (born 1837)
- 1862 – James Madison Porter, American lawyer and politician, 18th United States Secretary of War (born 1793)
- 1880 – Ned Kelly, Australian bushranger (born 1855)
- 1880 – Lucretia Mott, American activist (born 1793)
- 1884 – Alfred Brehm, German zoologist, author, and illustrator (born 1827)
- 1887 – Haymarket affair defendants:
- 1887 – George Engel, German-American businessman and activist (born 1836)
- 1887 – Adolph Fischer, German-American printer and activist (born 1858)
- 1887 – Albert Parsons, American journalist and activist (born 1848)
- 1887 – August Spies, American journalist and activist (born 1855)
- 1888 – Pedro Ñancúpel, Chilean pirate active in the fjords and channels of Patagonia. He was executed.

=== 1901–present ===
- 1917 – Liliuokalani of Hawaii (born 1838)
- 1918 - Henry Gunther, American soldier, believed to be the last man killed in World War I (born 1895)
- 1918 – George Lawrence Price, Canadian soldier, last casualty of the British Empire of World War I (born 1892)
- 1919 – Pavel Chistyakov, Russian painter and educator (born 1832)
- 1921 – Léon Moreaux, French target shooter (born 1852)
- 1931 – Shibusawa Eiichi, Japanese businessman (born 1840)
- 1939 – Bob Marshall, American author and activist (born 1901)
- 1940 – Muhittin Akyüz, Turkish general and diplomat (born 1870)
- 1944 – Munir Ertegun, Turkish diplomat (born 1883)
- 1945 – Jerome Kern, American composer (born 1885)
- 1949 – Loukas Kanakaris-Roufos, Greek lawyer and politician, Greek Minister of Foreign Minister (born 1878)
- 1950 – Alexandros Diomidis, Greek banker and politician, 145th Prime Minister of Greece (born 1875)
- 1953 – Princess Irene of Hesse and by Rhine (born 1866)
- 1961 – Behiç Erkin, Turkish colonel and politician, Turkish Minister of Environment and Urban Planning (born 1876)
- 1962 – Joseph Ruddy, American swimmer and water polo player (born 1878)
- 1965 – Luis Arturo González López Guatemalan supreme court judge and briefly acting president (born 1900)
- 1968 – Jeanne Demessieux, French pianist and composer (born 1921)
- 1972 – Berry Oakley, American bass player (born 1948)
- 1973 – Artturi Ilmari Virtanen, Finnish chemist and academic, Nobel Prize laureate (born 1895)
- 1973 – Richard von Frankenberg, German race car driver and journalist (born 1922)
- 1974 – Alfonso Leng, Chilean dentist, composer, and academic (born 1894)
- 1976 – Alexander Calder, American sculptor (born 1898)
- 1977 – Abraham Sarmiento, Jr., Filipino journalist and activist (born 1950)
- 1979 – Dimitri Tiomkin, Ukrainian-American composer and conductor (born 1894)
- 1980 – Vince Gair, Australian politician, 27th Premier of Queensland (born 1901)
- 1982 – Marcel Paul, French communist politician and Holocaust survivor (born 1900)
- 1984 – Martin Luther King, Sr., American pastor, missionary, and activist (born 1899)
- 1985 – Pelle Lindbergh, Swedish ice hockey player (born 1959)
- 1985 – Arthur Rothstein, American photographer and educator (born 1915)
- 1988 – Charles Groves Wright Anderson, South African-Australian colonel and politician (born 1897)
- 1988 – William Ifor Jones, Welsh conductor and organist (born 1900)
- 1990 – Attilio Demaría, Argentinian footballer (born 1909)
- 1990 – Sadi Irmak, Turkish physician and politician, 17th Prime Minister of Turkey (born 1904)
- 1990 – Alexis Minotis, Greek actor and director (born 1900)
- 1990 – Yiannis Ritsos, Greek poet and playwright (born 1909)
- 1993 – Erskine Hawkins, American trumpet player and bandleader (born 1914)
- 1993 – John Stanley, American author and illustrator (born 1914)
- 1994 – John A. Volpe, American soldier and politician, 61st Governor of Massachusetts (born 1908)
- 1994 – Tadeusz Żychiewicz, Polish journalist, historian, and publicist (born 1922)
- 1997 – Rod Milburn, American hurdler and coach (born 1950)
- 1997 – William Alland, American film producer and writer (born 1916)
- 1998 – Frank Brimsek, American ice hockey player and soldier (born 1913)
- 1998 – Paddy Clancy, Irish singer and actor (born 1922)
- 1999 – Mary Kay Bergman, American voice actress (born 1961)
- 1999 – Jacobo Timerman, Argentinian journalist and author (born 1923)
- 2000 – Sandra Schmitt, German skier (born 1981)
- 2001 – Erna Viitol, Estonian sculptor (born 1920)
- 2002 – Frances Ames, South African neurologist, psychiatrist, and human rights activist (born 1920)
- 2003 – Miquel Martí i Pol, Catalan poet (born 1929)
- 2004 – Dayton Allen, American comedian and voice actor (born 1919)
- 2004 – Yasser Arafat, Palestinian engineer and politician, 1st President of the Palestinian National Authority, Nobel Prize laureate (born 1929)
- 2004 – Richard Dembo, French director and screenwriter (born 1948)
- 2005 – Moustapha Akkad, Syrian-American director and producer (born 1930)
- 2005 – Patrick Anson, 5th Earl of Lichfield, English photographer (born 1939)
- 2005 – Peter Drucker, Austrian-American author, theorist, and educator (born 1909)
- 2006 – Belinda Emmett, Australian actress (born 1974)
- 2007 – Delbert Mann, American director and producer (born 1920)
- 2008 – Herb Score, American baseball player and sportscaster (born 1933)
- 2008 – Mustafa Şekip Birgöl, Turkish colonel (born 1903)
- 2010 – Marie Osborne Yeats, American actress and costume designer (born 1911)
- 2011 – Francisco Blake Mora, Mexican lawyer and politician, Mexican Secretary of the Interior (born 1966)
- 2012 – Lam Adesina, Nigerian educator and politician, Governor of Oyo State (born 1939)
- 2012 – Joe Egan, English rugby player and coach (born 1919)
- 2012 – Rex Hunt, English lieutenant, pilot, and diplomat, Governor of the Falkland Islands (born 1926)
- 2012 – Victor Mees, Belgian footballer (born 1927)
- 2012 – Harry Wayland Randall, American photographer (born 1915)
- 2013 – John Barnhill, American basketball player and coach (born 1938)
- 2013 – Domenico Bartolucci, Italian cardinal and composer (born 1917)
- 2013 – Bob Beckham, American singer-songwriter (born 1927)
- 2013 – John S. Dunne, American priest and theologian (born 1929)
- 2013 – Atilla Karaosmanoğlu, Turkish economist and politician, 33rd Deputy Prime Minister of Turkey (born 1931)
- 2014 – John Doar, American lawyer and activist (born 1921)
- 2014 – Big Bank Hank, American rapper (born 1956)
- 2014 – Philip G. Hodge, American engineer and academic (born 1920)
- 2014 – Harry Lonsdale, American chemist, businessman, and politician (born 1932)
- 2014 – Carol Ann Susi, American actress (born 1952)
- 2015 – Rita Gross, American theologian and author (born 1943)
- 2015 – Nathaniel Marston, American actor and producer (born 1975)
- 2016 – Victor Bailey, American singer and bass player (born 1960)
- 2016 – Robert Vaughn, American actor (born 1932)
- 2017 – Chiquito de la Calzada, Spanish singer, actor and comedian (born 1932)
- 2021 – F. W. de Klerk, South African lawyer and politician, former State President of South Africa, Nobel Prize laureate (born 1936)
- 2024 – Frank Auerbach, German-British painter (born 1931)
- 2024 – John Robinson, American football player and coach (born 1935)

== Holidays and observances ==
- Birthday of King Jigme Singye Wangchuck (Bhutan)
- Children's Day (Croatia)
- Christian feast day:
  - Blessed Alicja Kotowska
  - Bartholomew of Grottaferrata
  - Blessed Eugene Bossilkov
  - Marina of Omura
  - Martin of Tours, and its related observances.
  - Menas
  - Mercurius (Coptic)
  - Søren Kierkegaard (Lutheran Church)
  - Theodore the Studite
  - November 11 (Eastern Orthodox liturgics)
- End of World War I-related observances:
  - Armistice Day (France, Belgium and Serbia)
  - National Independence Day (Poland), commemorates the anniversary of Poland's assumption of independent statehood in 1918
  - Remembrance Day (United Kingdom and the Commonwealth of Nations, including Australia and Canada)
  - Veterans Day, called Armistice Day until 1954, when it was rededicated to honor American military (Army, Navy, Marine, and Air Force) veterans. (United States)
- Independence Day, celebrates the independence of Angola from Portugal in 1975.
- Independence of Cartagena (Colombia)
- Lāčplēsis Day, celebrates the victory over the Bermontians at the Battle of Riga in 1919. (Latvia)
- Opening of carnival ("Karneval"/"Fasching"), on 11-11, at 11:11. (Germany, the Netherlands, and other countries)
- National Education Day (India)
- Republic Day (Maldives)
- Singles' Day (China)
- St. Martin's Day (Sint Maarten, Kingdom of the Netherlands)
- Pepero Day (South Korea) and Pocky Day (Japan), both celebrating the similar dipped biscuit snacks of their respective countries.
