= Tauss =

Tauss is a surname. Notable people with the surname include:

- Herbert Tauss (1929–2001), American artist, illustrator, and painter
- Jörg Tauss (born 1953), German politician
- Roger Tauss, Swiss slalom canoeist

== See also ==
- Tuss
