= List of journalists killed during the War in Afghanistan (2001–2021) =

Places in Afghanistan where journalists were killed during the war. Blue pins mark the location where more than 1 journalist was killed in an attack. A gold pin marks the location for multiple attacks.

List of journalists killed during the War in Afghanistan (2001–2021) accounts for journalists killed while reporting about the war.

Date	Name	Location	Notes	Refs
16 July 2021	Danish Siddiqui (India)	Spin Buldak, Kandahar	Indian photojournalist and Pulitzer Prize winner, working for Reuters. He was killed along with a senior Afghan officer while covering Afghan Special Forces' attempt to retake an area from Taliban in Spin Buldak district of Kandahar.	
11 May 2019	Mina Mangal (Afghanistan)	Kabul	Afghan journalist, activist and political advisor. Shot dead in Kabul under suspicious circumstances (possible honour killing).	
30 April 2018	Shah Marai (Afghanistan)	Kabul	Afghan photojournalist working for the Agence France-Presse. He was killed along with several other journalists in an ISIL suicide bombing while covering the April 2018 Kabul suicide bombings.	
5 June 2016	David Gilkey (United States)	Helmand Province	Gilkey was a US photojournalist for NPR. Tamanna was a journalist working as an interpreter. Both were killed in Taliban ambush while traveling with a convey of Afghan soldiers. Gilkey was initially thought to have been killed by an RPG, but further investigation showed that his cause of death was severe burns.	
5 June 2016	Zabihullah Tamanna	Helmand Province	Gilkey was a US photojournalist for NPR. Tamanna was a journalist working as an interpreter. Both were killed in Taliban ambush while traveling with a convey of Afghan soldiers. Gilkey was initially thought to have been killed by an RPG, but further investigation showed that his cause of death was severe burns.	
4 April 2014	Anja Niedringhaus (Germany)	Khost Province	German photojournalist working for the Associated Press. She was shot by a man wearing a police officer's uniform while covering the country's 2014 presidential election.	
11 March 2014	Nils Horner (Sweden)	Kabul	Reporter for Swedish Radio SR - He was killed during a talk with his Afghan translator on the street of the capital Kabul. He was war correspondent of the Swedish Radio station since 2001 and reported for them from the Afghanistan and Iraq war.	
23 January 2014	Noor Ahmad Noori	Helmand Province	Reporter for Radio Bost - Noori was tortured and killed in Lashkar Gah, Helmand Province by an unknown assailant. His body was found in a plastic bag in a Lashkar Gah suburb.	
21 February 2012	Sadim Khan Bhadrzai	Urgon District	The director of Radio Mehman – Melina was killed by an unknown assailant.	
28 July 2011	Ahmad Omaid Khpalwak	Tarin Kowt, Uruzgan	A soldier from the International Security Assistance Force mistakenly killed Khpalwak, who worked for Pajhwok Afghan News and the BBC News, while clearing a broadcasting building of possible enemy.	
24 June 2010	James P. Hunter (United States)	Zhari district, Kandahar Province	Killed while covering a foot patrol. The first US military journalist to die in the War in Afghanistan.	
10 January 2010	Rupert Hamer (United Kingdom)	Nawa, Nawa-I-Barakzayi District, Helmand Province	The British Sunday Mirror war correspondent and his photographer were traveling with US troops when their vehicle hit an IED. Hamer died along with a US marine. His photographer survived with injuries as well as other injured soldiers.	
30 December 2009	Michelle Lang (Canada)	Kandahar, Kandahar Province	The Calgary Herald reporter was killed by an IED that was struck by the vehicle carrying Lang and 4 Canadian soldiers.	
9 September 2009	Sultan Munadi	Char Dara District, Kunduz Province	An Afghan interpreter held captive with British colleague Stephen Farrell of the New York Times, Munadi was killed during the rescue attempt.	
7 June 2008	Abdul Samad Rohani	Lashkar Gah, Helmand Province	The first Pajhwok Afghan News and BBC News journalist to be killed; he was found dead one day after he was abducted. His captors taunted him with the fate of Ajmal Naqshbandi before killing him.	
15 January 2008	Carsten Thomassen (Norway)	Kabul	The Norwegian journalist worked for Dagbladet and was killed in a Taliban terrorist attack on a hotel in the capital.	
6 June 2007	Zakia Zaki	Jabal Saraj, Parwan Province	Shot in her home, she was the owner of a radio station and a critic of the Taliban.	
8 April 2007	Ajmal Naqshbandi	Helmand Province	He was the fixer for kidnapped Italian-Swiss journalist Daniele Mastrogiacomo of La Repubblica. His execution was the subject of a documentary film. The team driver Sayed Agha was also killed.	
7 October 2006	Christian Struwe (Germany)	Baghlan Province	Struwe and Fischer, who worked as freelance documentary filmmakers for Deutsche Welle, were believed to be on their way to the Buddha statues in Bamyan Province that were destroyed under the Taliban. Their killing brought to three the number of German journalists killed in the war.	
7 October 2006	Karen Fischer (Germany)	Baghlan Province	Struwe and Fischer, who worked as freelance documentary filmmakers for Deutsche Welle, were believed to be on their way to the Buddha statues in Bamyan Province that were destroyed under the Taliban. Their killing brought to three the number of German journalists killed in the war.	
22 July 2006	Abdul Qodus	Kandahar	The camera operator for TV Aryana was killed in the second of two blasts from a suicide bombing.	
26 November 2001	Ulf Strömberg (Sweden)	Taloqan, Kunduz Province	The Swedish TV4 camera operator was killed in a robbery of a house where several Swedish journalists were staying.	
19 November 2001	Harry Burton (Australia)	Between Jalalabad and Kabul	Burton and Haidari were photojournalists for Reuters. Fuentes was a journalist for El Mundo. Cutuli was a reporter for Il Corriere della Sera. The four were killed in an ambush.	
19 November 2001	Azizullah Haidari	Between Jalalabad and Kabul	Burton and Haidari were photojournalists for Reuters. Fuentes was a journalist for El Mundo. Cutuli was a reporter for Il Corriere della Sera. The four were killed in an ambush.	
19 November 2001	Julio Fuentes (Spain)	Between Jalalabad and Kabul	Burton and Haidari were photojournalists for Reuters. Fuentes was a journalist for El Mundo. Cutuli was a reporter for Il Corriere della Sera. The four were killed in an ambush.	
19 November 2001	Maria Grazia Cutuli (Italy)	Between Jalalabad and Kabul	Burton and Haidari were photojournalists for Reuters. Fuentes was a journalist for El Mundo. Cutuli was a reporter for Il Corriere della Sera. The four were killed in an ambush.	
11 November 2001	Pierre Billaud (France)	Dasht-e Qaleh	Billaud was a reporter for Radio Tele Luxembourg. Sutton was a reporter for Radio France International and was the first female journalist to die in the War in Afghanistan. Handloik was a freelance journalist. The three were killed when the tank they were in was attacked. Two journalists, Australian Paul McGeough and French Véronique Reyberotte, survived.	
11 November 2001	Johanne Sutton (France)	Dasht-e Qaleh	Billaud was a reporter for Radio Tele Luxembourg. Sutton was a reporter for Radio France International and was the first female journalist to die in the War in Afghanistan. Handloik was a freelance journalist. The three were killed when the tank they were in was attacked. Two journalists, Australian Paul McGeough and French Véronique Reyberotte, survived.	
11 November 2001	Volker Handloik (Germany)	Dasht-e Qaleh	Billaud was a reporter for Radio Tele Luxembourg. Sutton was a reporter for Radio France International and was the first female journalist to die in the War in Afghanistan. Handloik was a freelance journalist. The three were killed when the tank they were in was attacked. Two journalists, Australian Paul McGeough and French Véronique Reyberotte, survived.	

== See also ==
- War in Afghanistan (2001–present)
- Human rights in Afghanistan
