= Sultan Munadi =

Afghan journalist

Sultan Mohammad Munadi (Persian: سلطان محمد منادی; 22 November 1976 – 9 September 2009) was an Afghan journalist, reporter, production manager and translator. He worked for the International Red Crescent, The New York Times and Afghan state radio at various times during his career in journalism. Munadi was killed by friendly fire on 9 September 2009 in a British Special Boat Service special forces raid meant to rescue Stephen Farrell and Munadi, who were both captured by Taliban forces near Kunduz four days earlier.

== Biography ==
=== Early life ===
Munadi was born in Astana, Bazarak District, in Panjshir province, Afghanistan, on 22 November 1976. Munadi, an ethnic Tajik, grew up around the family's farm in the village of Astana in the Panjshir Valley. His father fought against Soviet forces during the Soviet–Afghan War in the 1980s. The family's home in Astana, which was used as a command post by the mujahedeen, was bombed by Soviet troops. Munadi and his brothers rebuilt the family home by hand following the bombing.

Munadi attended Amir Sharali Khan Primary School. He graduated from Nadiria High School in 1991.

=== Career ===
Munadi was accepted into the journalism program at Kabul University in 1995. He also took a course in English while studying journalism at the university. In 1996, the Taliban seized control of the city of Kabul, forcing Munadi to temporarily abandon his undergraduate studies. He eventually received his bachelor's degree in journalism from Kabul University.

Munadi worked as a press officer and liaison for the International Red Cross and Red Crescent's local office in Gulbahar, Parwan Province, during the period of Taliban control from 1997 until 2001. He coordinated communications between the office in northern Afghanistan and the ICRC main headquarters in Kabul.

Munadi joined the Afghan staff of The New York Times in 2002, following the ouster of the Taliban and establishment of an interim government. Munadi worked as a local correspondent in the Kabul office for The New York Times and contributed reports to the headquarters in New York City. He also translated Dari, Pashto and English documents and reports for the newspaper. Munadi remained with The New York Times until 2006.

In 2006, Munadi joined the staff of Good Morning Afghanistan (GMA), which is produced by AwaNama Productions. He was employed as a production manager for the radio show, and performed the tasks of editor, director and radio producer. He was later promoted to the editor of the show's website and radio broadcasts, and assigned stories to journalists.

Munadi moved to Germany in early 2009, where he enrolled in a graduate program at University of Erfurt School of Public Policy towards a master's degree in public policy, good governance and journalism. He returned to Afghanistan from Germany twice during 2009.

=== Kidnapping and death ===
Munadi returned to Afghanistan from Germany during his summer break to visit his wife and two children. The New York Times contacted Munadi while he was in Afghanistan to ask him to assist its foreign correspondents in the country. On 5 September 2009, Munadi and his colleague Stephen Farrell were kidnapped by the Taliban in northern Afghanistan near Kunduz. Munadi and Farrell were in the area interviewing local residents about a recent NATO airstrike on two fuel tankers (that had been kidnapped by Taliban militants) which had allegedly killed Afghan civilians.

Munadi and Farrell were held by Taliban militants for four days. The Taliban treated Farrell rather well, but were increasingly threatening and abusive to Munadi while he was in captivity. The Taliban reminded Munadi of a 2007 kidnapping in which an Italian reporter, Daniele Mastrogiacomo, was freed while his Afghan translator was killed and beheaded. Munadi had called his parents at 10:30 p.m. on 8 September to report that he and Farrell were safe. His parents immediately left their home in Kabul to travel to Kunduz to await a possible release.

British Military Intelligence discovered the house in which Munadi and Farrell were being held. On 9 September, the British Special Boat Service raided the home to rescue the captives. Farrell was rescued, but Munadi was shot and killed in the firefight between the Taliban and British forces. It was later concluded that Munadi was shot in the front by a British soldier while he was also apparently shot by Taliban bullets while trying to get to the helicopter after the British mistook him for an enemy militant.

Munadi's body was left at the scene and his parents reportedly had to collect his body themselves. Neither The New York Times nor the Munadi or Farrell families knew about the planned rescue attempt in advance. Munadi's death and the failure to retrieve his body resulted in widespread anger among Afghan journalists, claiming that Munadi's death revealed a double standard by international forces over the treatment of Western reporters versus local Afghan journalists.

== See also ==
- List of journalists killed during the War in Afghanistan (2001–present)
