= Walkley Award for Journalism Leadership =

The Walkley Award for Journalism Leadership is an Australian award that recognises outstanding acts of courage and bravery in the practice of journalism, in the prestigious Walkley Awards series. The inaugural award, for Excellence in News Leadership, was made in 1997. It became the award for Excellence in Journalism Leadership in 1998.

In 2017 the Walkley Foundation announced that due to a reorganisation of categories, the Journalism Leadership award would no longer be given out.

== List of winners ==
List of Walkley Award winners for Journalism Leadership
Year	Recipient(s)	Program / Title	Media outlet / Publisher	Notes
1997	Stephen Rice	Sunday	Nine Network	
1998	Laurie Oakes		Nine Network	
1999	Brian Toohey			
2000	Mike Steketee	The Australian		
2001	Paul Kelly	The Australian		
2002	Peter Meakin		Nine Network	
2003	Paul McGeough		Fairfax Media	
2004	Les Carlyon			
2005	Deborah Fleming	Australian Story	ABC TV	
2006	Michelle Grattan	The Age; Radio National Breakfast	Fairfax Media; ABC	
2007	Eric Beecher		Private Media	
2008	no award			
2009	John Hartigan		News Limited	
2010	Kerry O'Brien	The 7:30 Report	ABC TV	
2011	Kylie Holland	Freelance journalist		
2012	The Border Mail			
2013	Gerard Ryle			
2014	Bob Cronin	The West Australian	Seven West Media	
2015	Debi Marshall			
2016	Rebecca Wilson			awarded posthumously

== See also ==
- Walkley Awards
