= Michelle Grattan =

Australian journalist (born 1944)

Michelle Grattan AO FASSA
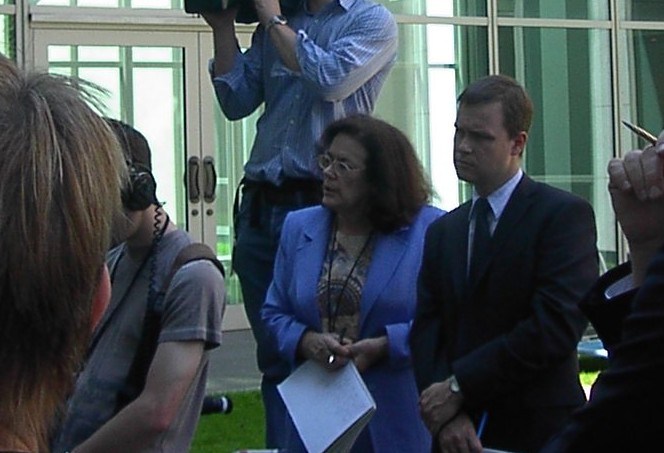
- Grattan in November 2002
- Born: 30 June 1944 (age 82); Kew, Victoria, Australia
- Education: Ruyton Girls' School; University of Melbourne
- Occupations: Journalist, author, newspaper editor
- Years active: 1970—present

Michelle Grattan (born 30 June 1944) is an Australian journalist who was the first woman to become editor of an Australian metropolitan daily newspaper. Specialising in political journalism, she has written for and edited many significant Australian newspapers. She is currently the chief political correspondent with The Conversation, Australia's largest independent news website.

== Career ==
Grattan was educated in Kew, Victoria at Ruyton Girls' School. She completed a Bachelor of Arts at the University of Melbourne, majoring in politics, and then worked as a tutor at Monash University for a period before deciding to pursue journalism as a career. Grattan was recruited by The Age newspaper in 1970, and joined the Canberra Press Gallery in 1971. In 1976, she was appointed the Chief Political Correspondent for The Age, a position she held until 1993. After leaving The Age in 1993, Grattan was appointed the editor of The Canberra Times, becoming the first female editor of a metropolitan daily newspaper in Australia. After two years in this position she was sacked and returned to The Age, where she became the political editor.

In 1996, Grattan joined The Australian Financial Review as a senior writer, and three years later, was appointed Chief Political Correspondent at The Sydney Morning Herald. She returned to The Age in 2002 as a columnist, and was made Political Editor and Bureau Chief in 2004.

On 4 February 2013 she announced her resignation from The Age to take up a position as professorial fellow at the University of Canberra, and to become the Chief Political Correspondent of The Conversation.

Grattan has co-authored several books, including Can Ministers Cope?, Back on the Wool Track and Reformers, and has edited collections such as Australian Prime Ministers and Reconciliation.

== Honours ==
In 1988, Grattan was awarded the Graham Perkin Australian Journalist of the Year Award. She was inducted onto the Victorian Honour Roll of Women in 2001. The following year she was elected a Fellow of the Academy of the Social Sciences in Australia. In the Australia Day Honours in 2004, Grattan was made an Officer of the Order of Australia (AO) for her long and distinguished service to Australian journalism. She won a Walkley Award for Journalism Leadership in 2006. She is an adjunct professor at the University of Queensland's School of Journalism and Communication. Grattan was awarded an honorary Doctor of Letters by the University of Sydney in 2017.

== Notes ==
1. Hurst, Daniel (4 February 2013). "Grattan quits Age with call for diversity". The Age. Fairfax Media. Archived from the original on 6 February 2013.
2. Weller, Patrick Moray; Grattan, Michelle (1981). Can ministers cope? : Australian federal ministers at work. Richmond, Vic.: Hutchinson of Australia. ISBN 0-09-137690-4. OCLC 11624171.
3. Bowman, Margaret & Grattan, Michelle (1989). Reformers : shaping Australian society from the 60s to the 80s. Collins Dove. ISBN 0-85924-775-9.
4. Grattan, Michelle (2000). Australian prime ministers. Frenchs Forest, N.S.W.: New Holland. ISBN 1-86436-671-0. OCLC 222696479.
5. Grattan, Michelle, ed. (2000). Reconciliation : essays on Australian reconciliation. Melbourne: Bookman Press. ISBN 1-86395-186-5. OCLC 44894187.

== Sources ==
- "About Michelle Grattan". Radio National Breakfast. Archived from the original on 23 January 2010.
