= Saadia Sehar Haidari =

Pakistani journalist

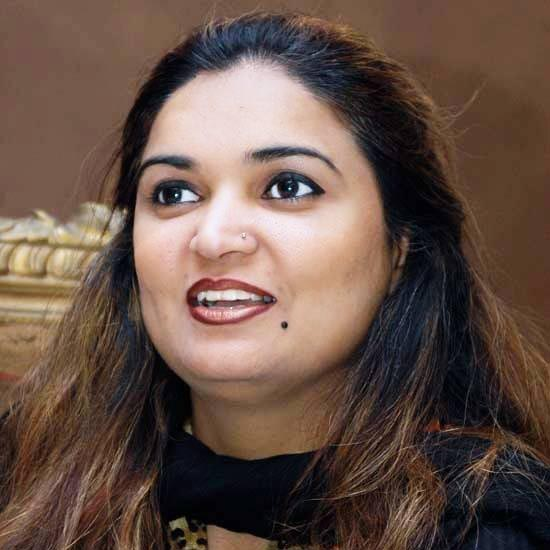
- Born: 16 February 1971 (age 55); Lahore, Pakistan
- Education: University of Punjab; Government College University, Lahore; Allama Iqbal Open University
- Occupation: journalist
- Known for: Photojournalism
- Spouse(s): Aziz Ullah Haidari was a journalist in Reutuers, killed by Taliban in Afghanistan in 2001
- Children: 2
- Parent: Mirza Qaiser Bakht

Saadia Sehar Haidari (born in Lahore, 16 February 1971) is a Pakistani photo- and video-journalist.

Saadia Sehar Haidari's grandfather, Muhammed Buksh Bhatti was also a photographer of subcontinent and the owner of the M. Bhatti Photo and Portrait studio, established in 1942, Lahore. Haidari became Pakistan's first employed female photojournalist for the Associated Press of Pakistan and Geo News, and was inspired to enter journalism after her husband who was killed by the Taliban. While mourning the loss of her husband, Haidari was offered a job by Reuters which she accepted.

Haidari has received numerous accolades. She has been selected to attend many international programs and seminars on photojournalism and had the opportunity to visit Washington under the U.S.-Pakistan cultural exchange program. She is national and international award-winning journalist. Saadia received the "Best photojournalist of the year award" by Agahi Award. She was declared ‘Media Woman of the Year’ by the Excellence Award Foundation and the Ministry of Information and Broadcasting in 2009. She was awarded Press Freedom Award 2011.

She has appeared on Al Jazeera Arabic, Voice of America and Pakistan Television Corporation television news channels. The National Press Photographer's Association has ranked her among the top tier photojournalists of Pakistan.
