= Noor Ahmed Noori =

Afghan radio journalist

- Born: ca. 1985
- Died: January 23, 2014; Lashkar Gah, Helmand, Afghanistan
- Cause of death: Murder by strangulation
- Body discovered: In a car salesman's yard
- Occupations: Journalist for radio and print
- Employer(s): Radio Bost FM Helmand & The New York Times
- Family: Rasiullah, elder brother

Noor Ahmed Noori (ca. 1985 – January 23, 2014), often transliterated as Ahmad, was an Afghan radio journalist for Radio Bost FM station in Helmand province and for The New York Times. Noori worked as a translator from 2010 to 2013 and was killed in Afghanistan in 2014. Noori was the first journalist to be killed in Helmand in five years. Noori was also the first to be killed in a week that would be followed by several other killings in the Kabul area, including a suicide bombing the Taliban claimed responsibility for.

== Personal life ==
Noor Ahmed Noori, 29 years old, was engaged to be married at the time he was murdered. He lived outside of Lashkar Gah, the capital of Helmand Province which is fairly secure from the Taliban inside the city limits. Noori could speak fluent English. He was well known and familiar with the local government officials including the civilians who were working with the United States military mission.

== Career ==
Noori worked with several different news organizations in Helmand province. He worked as a translator at The New York Times from 2010 to 2013. Additionally, he has worked with several different NGO's and maintained a good reputation among his peers. Noori also established an institution called "Khybar", which focused on teaching English alongside computer skills. He worked at this institution for several years as a teacher. This decision to start teaching reportedly was made after he spent some time in neighboring country Pakistan, where he picked up the knowledge required for such a task. At the time of his death he was a producer for two religious programs at Radio Bost, called "Membar" and "Mehrab". Radio Bost was primarily known for reports on culture, religion, entertainment, and social issues. Ahmed Shah Passon, Noori's director at Radio Bost, said Noori had not reported on anything controversial or sensitive at Radio Bost.

== Death ==
Location of the place where they were killed in relation to the capital Kabul.

Noor Ahmed Noori's bloodied body was found in a sack at Lashkar Gah, where he lived. Family members, including his brother, said that he had received threatening phone calls before his death. Bost Radio manager said that he was being threatened by anti-government armed militant groups during the recent months. Before his body was discovered, Noori had been missing since 10 a.m. local time. His body was found in a car salesman's yard. Abdul Ahad Coopan, the spokesperson for the provincial police chief said when the bag his body was in was found they believed it was a bomb before further investigating. A forensic doctor at Lashkar Gah hospital had said that Noor Ahmed Noori had been tortured before being murdered. He was beaten and stabbed to death. His death was caused by at least two knife blows to the head and likely strangulation with a scarf.

== Context ==
Helmand is one of the country's most dangerous regions for journalists. In Helmand a press conference was held, many journalists then stated that they felt powerless against threats they had been receiving to the point in which they are unable to work properly. Although the city of Lashkar Gah, where Noori was murdered, is somewhat secure the Taliban are able to move with considerable freedom.

== Impact ==
Noori was the first journalist to be murdered in five years, the last murder being BBC reporter Abdul Samad Rohani who was shot to death in Helmand in 2008

The same week Noori died, another journalist in Kabul was murdered when a suicide bomber attacked an Afghan army bus in Kabul on Sunday, killing four people and wounding up to 22, police said, the latest incident in a worrying surge of violence in the Afghan capital over the past 10 days. The Taliban quickly claimed responsibility for the attack. Among the victims of Sunday's attack was local radio journalist Shahid Naimi, according to police, who happened to be near the bus when the bomber blew himself up.

Abdul Hadi Hamdard, another Afghan journalist, was killed by a roadside bomb in 2012, but it was unclear if he was the target of that attack.

== Reactions ==
Irina Bokova, director-general of UNESCO, said, "I condemn the killing of Noor Ahmad Noori and Ahmad Shahid. I call on the authorities to spare no effort to improve the safety of journalists. Their work is indispensable to open debate, reconciliation and reconstruction."

Danielle Rhodes, the New York Times communications director, said, "We are looking into what happened. Our deepest sympathies go out..."

Abdul Salam Passon, manager for Radio Bost, said, "He was a decent person and his programs caused no problems. His voice was known to everyone throughout the providence." Passon also said that Noori was threatened several times, but never elaborated by whom and why.

A statement released by Reporters Without Borders said, "We extend our condolences to Noori's family and colleagues and we ask the Afghan government to ensure that the investigation promised by Helmand's governor is effective and leads quickly to the identification of this murder's perpetrators and instigators."

== See also ==
- List of journalists killed during the War in Afghanistan (2001–present)
