= Reza Khan (murderer) =

Reza Khan (died October 8, 2007) was charged on August 5, 2004, in Kabul, Afghanistan of murder, rape, and robbery involving four journalists on November 19, 2001. Khan was also accused of cutting off the noses and ears of four Afghan men due to their short beards. Khan was convicted in November 2004 and executed in Afghanistan on October 8, 2007. Khan also confessed to killing his own wife in Pakistan.

The journalists (Harry Burton, Maria Grazia Cutuli, Azizullah Haidari and Julio Fuentes) were traveling in a convoy from Jalalabad to Kabul when a group of armed men dragged them from their cars and murdered them.

Khan confessed to being one of 11 people who stopped the vehicles, and to personally killing one of the foreign men and raping Cutuli; he said they got their orders from Taliban leader Maulawi Latif.

== See also ==
- Rape in Afghanistan
