= James P. Hunter =

American journalist

James Patrick Hunter (January 22, 1985 – June 18, 2010), of South Amherst, Ohio, was an Army journalist stationed in Kandahar, Afghanistan. Hunter was the first Army journalist to die in combat since the beginning of the War in Afghanistan.

== Career ==
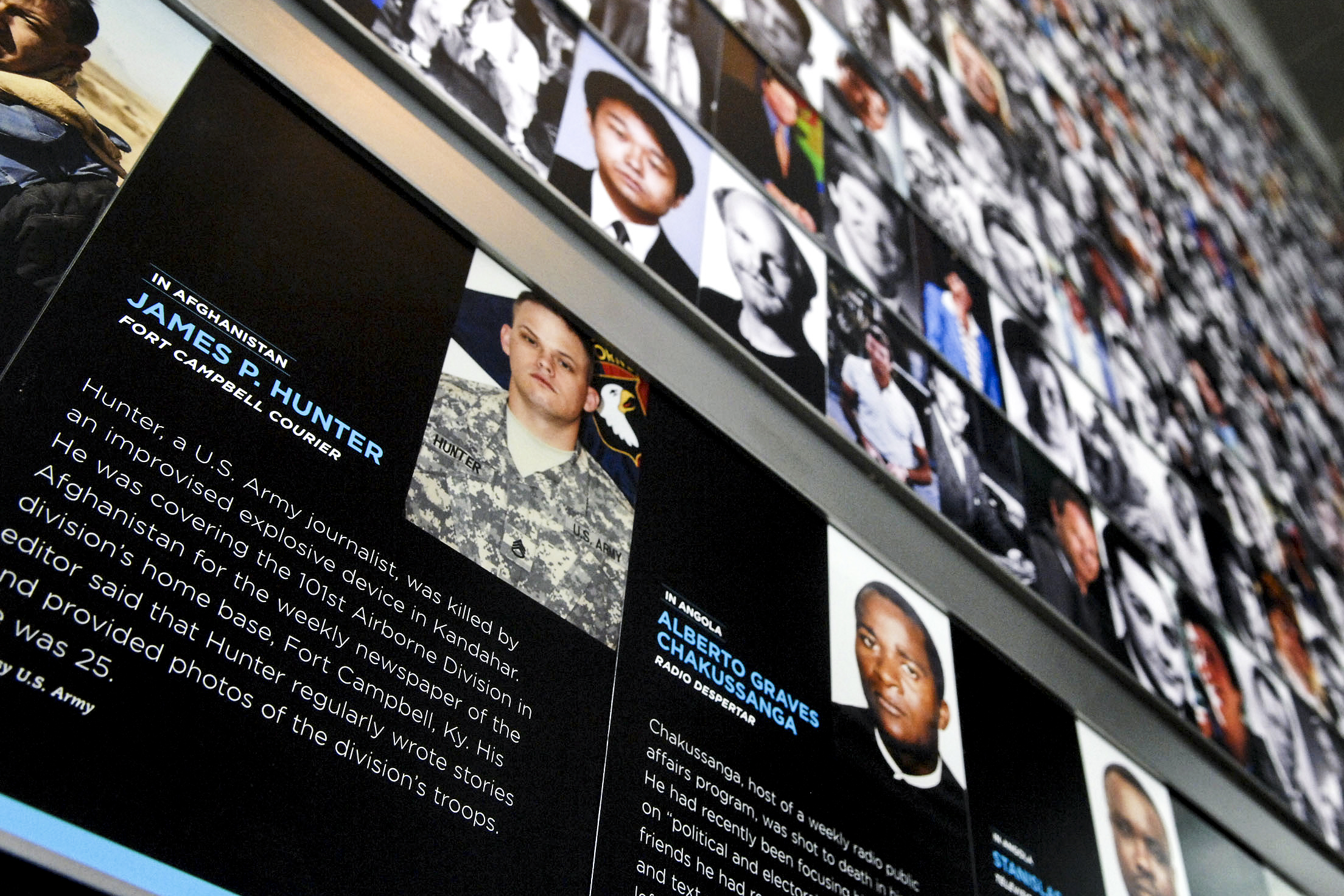
The photograph and short biography of Army Staff Sgt. James Hunter displays near the Journalists Memorial at the Newseum in Washington, D.C. Hunter was among 77 fallen journalists honored at the 2011 rededication of the memorial, May 16, 2011.

Staff Sergeant Hunter spent seven years in the U.S. Army, beginning in August 2003. A veteran of two tours in Iraq, Hunter was on duty in Afghanistan at the time of his death and was killed 25 days into his current tour of deployment. He had been a member of Headquarters Company, 502nd Infantry Regiment, 2nd Brigade Combat Team, 101st Airborne Division (Air Assault) out of Fort Campbell since May 2007. During his service to the United States, Hunter was recognized for his work with awards such as the Iraq Campaign Medal and the Army Commendation Medal, which are both from the Armed Forces.

Hunter wrote for The Courier, which is a military base publication for Fort Campbell, Kentucky. He was a photographer and print reporter covering the War in Afghanistan at the time of his death.

His fellow journalists, who had worked with him, reported about his dedication in reporting from the front lines during his deployments.

== Death ==
Places mentioned in Afghanistan relative to the largest city and capital Kabul.

Hunter was killed on June 18, 2010, while reporting on his unit's foot patrol movements in the Zhari District of Kandahar, where his unit was struck by an Improvised Explosive Device. Another soldier was killed in the same incident.

== Context ==
In 2011, Kandahar was one of the last Taliban strongholds.

In June 2011, NATO forces were launching their major offensive in Kandahar, as part of the new war strategy that was launched earlier that year in Marjah. The new strategy focused on clearing Taliban strongholds while protecting local population. They brought in large numbers of U.S. and Afghan troops into the city to participate in the "clearing phase" of the plan.

Kandahar was also going through internal problems when Afghan insurgents assassinated the Mayor. A suicide bomber, who hid the bomb under his turban, attacked Ghulam Haider Hamidi at his office.

== Impact ==
Hunter was the first Army journalist to be killed in Afghanistan since the conflict began in October 2001, and he was one of over 1,800 soldiers to be killed in Afghanistan.

The 23 other journalists who were killed in Afghanistan since 2001 were civilians who covered various topics ranging from human rights violations to politics.

== Personal ==
Staff Sergeant James Patrick Hunter was born in Lexington, Kentucky, to Patricia M. Phillips and William T. Hunter. He moved to South Amherst, Ohio, sometime in his younger years. He had been engaged to Candice Clark, whom he proposed to at the top of the Gateway Arch in St. Louis.

Memorial services were held for Staff Sergeant James Hunter at Firelands High School in South Amherst, where he graduated in 2003.

He was laid to rest at Lexington Cemetery in Lexington with services being held in Winchester, Kentucky.

== See also ==
- List of journalists killed during the War in Afghanistan (2001–present)
