= Aziz Ullah Haidari =

Afghan journalist

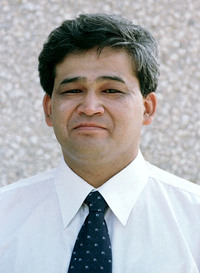
Azizullah Haidari, 2001.

Aziz Ullah Haidari (20 August 1968 in Kabul – 19 November 2001 in Nangarhar Province) was a Reuter's correspondent and photo-journalist in Pakistan. On 19 November 2001, he, along with three other journalists, were kidnapped and murdered by the Taliban on the highway of Sarobi area situated between Jalalabad and Kabul in Afghanistan.

Aziz Ullah Haidari, who was an intelligent and experienced journalist, had obtained employment with Reuters in Islamabad and continued with the organization before being murdered by the Taliban in 2001.

== Biography ==
Aziz Ullah Haidari was born on 20 August 1968 in Kabul, Afghanistan. His father, Hajji Qurban Haidari, owned a hotel in Afghanistan. Aziz had four brothers and two sisters. During the Soviet invasion, at the age of twelve, he, along with his family, had fled to Pakistan. During travel, they, like many other refugees, had faced many troubles and difficulties including being looted by robbers during the journey. After Immigration they settled in Hayatabad area of Peshawar city in Khyber Pakhtunkhwa. His elder brother also martyred, Jalil Haidari, who was a boxer and gold medalist.

In Peshawar he continued his study and was admitted to an English medium school. After completing his secondary education, Aziz then enrolled in Preston University, Peshawar. After completing his degree, he moved to Islamabad with his parents. He fell in love with a Pakistani girl, Saadia Sehar, a video-journalist and school teacher and married her on 28 January 1996 in Islamabad.

== Work ==
Aziz Ullah Haidari started his career as an assistant director of Foreign Relation of Mehracollah reconstruction services (NGO) for Afghanistan in 1990. He started teaching the English Language in a private English medium school National Academy in 1991. He started work as a journalist in 1987 with Pashto and Persian media. In 1990 he joined Reuters news agency as translator and monitoring news from Afghanistan. He was promoted as a correspondent in Reuters in 1992. He was also a photo journalist and did many exclusive works for Reuters. Julio Fuentes of Spain's El Mundo; Harry Burton, an Australian television cameraman and Maria Grazia Cutuli, a reporter with Italy's Corriere della Sera, were all killed when gunmen ambushed the convoy they were traveling in between Jalalabad and Kabul on 19 November 2001.

== Family ==
He has a daughter named Aleena Haidari and a son named Muhammad Ammad Haidari. His wife is named Saadia Sehar Haidari. After Aziz's death, she started work as a journalist and cameraperson.

== Death ==
Aziz Ullah Haidari moved to Afghanistan from Pakistan to cover the ongoing conflict there, working for Reuters at the time. On November of that year, he was riding in a car from Jalalabad to Kabul, the cars were yellow and white. Just a few days after the Taliban fell, his convoy was ordered to stop and their passengers ordered to get out by a steep valley of barren hills leading up into the highlands that surround Kabul. He was murdered with three other journalists, Julio Fuentes, Harry Burton and Maria Grazia Cutulli. Their mutilated bodies were found on 20 November 2001. Aziz Ullah Haidari was buried in H-8 Graveyard Islamabad on 22 November 2001.

== Murder trial ==
A Kabul court sentenced three men to death for the murders in 2004 and 2005 respectively. Two brothers, Mahmood Zar Jan and Abdul Wahid, were sentenced in 2005 and Mahmood Zar Jan, the suspected head of the gang that killed four journalists in November 2001. He was arrested together with four accomplices on the evening of 4 June after a shootout with police in which he sustained gunshot injuries. The arrest took place in Sorbi (50 km east of Kabul) not far from where the journalist Aziz Ullah Haidari, Maria Grazia Cutuli, Harry Burton and Julio Fuentes were murdered four years ago. He was transferred to Kabul. Zar Jan is alleged to have been the main person to give the order for the journalists to be slain.

Reza Khan, a member of the gang, was convicted of participating in the murders and sentenced to death on 20 November 2004.

== See also ==
- List of journalists killed during the War in Afghanistan (2001–14)
