= Death of Karen Fischer and Christian Struwe =

German journalists who were shot in Afghanistan

Karen Fischer
- Born: May 8, 1976; Stuttgart, Germany
- Died: October 7, 2006 (aged 30); Baghlan, Afghanistan
- Cause of death: Murder
- Resting place: Leonberg, Baden-Württemberg, Germany
- Education: Northeastern University
- Occupation: Journalist
- Employer: Deutsche Welle
- Partner: Christian Struwe

Christian Struwe
- Born: March 3, 1967
- Died: October 7, 2006 (aged 39); Baghlan, Afghanistan
- Cause of death: Murder
- Citizenship: Germany
- Occupations: Radio engineer, journalist and trainer
- Employer: Deutsche Welle
- Partner: Karen Fischer

On 7 October 2006, 30-year-old Karen Fischer and 39-year-old Christian Struwe, two German journalists working for Deutsche Welle, were shot in a tent they had pitched alongside a road near Baghlan in Afghanistan, while they were doing research for a freelance documentary. They were the first foreign journalists killed after the 2001 invasion in the War in Afghanistan

== Background ==
=== Personal ===
Karen Fischer was from Stuttgart, Germany. She attended Northeastern University in the United States and earned her master's degree in Journalism in 2000. She and Struwe were a couple (Lebensgefährte), having met in Kabul in 2004. Fischer was buried in Leonberg, Baden-Württemberg, which is close to Stuttgart.

=== Careers ===
Both Fischer and Struwe worked for Deutsche Welle, a German news service. DW was moving its Afghan radio service from Germany to Afghanistan. Struwe, a radio engineer and journalist, had been working for DW for five years. He had just launched an international news office at Afghanistan's Radio Television Afghanistan (RTA), where he also trained Afghan journalists. Fischer had been with DW for three years, completing her internship there from 2002 to 2003, and had reported on parliamentary elections in Afghanistan. Before Afghanistan, she had been a reporter for DW in the Middle East and Lebanon. Both reporters were considered experienced foreign journalists and had traveled to Afghanistan multiple times in the past for personal or business reasons.

== Death ==
Location of the place where they were killed in relation to the capital Kabul.

In October 2006, Karen Fischer and Christian Struwe were in Afghanistan on a private research trip to the historic site of the Buddha statues of Bamiyan, which the Taliban blew up in March 2001.

The two journalists pitched a tent on the side of the road to sleep for the night. Around 1:30 a.m., four to six armed men with AK-47 rifles approached their tent and shot them. Their rented car also was shot. Afterward, the attackers escaped on foot. There was no sign that they were robbed. Villagers heard the gunshots and found the bodies a few minutes later. Police arrested six men and interrogated them shortly afterward.

== Investigation ==
After solving the case of another German national, known as Christine M., who had been kidnapped at a restaurant in Afghanistan, authorities there announced that one of the four detained suspects was a possible "mastermind" behind the murder of Karen Fischer and Christian Struwe. Christine M. was pregnant at the time and she was working for the Christian aid Ora International organization. The detained group was described by police as criminals and not part of the Taliban.

== Context ==
The area around Baghlan, where the two were killed, was more secure than some of the country, but not well protected by the government. Some Germans in Afghanistan questioned the pair's decisions to backpack and tent instead of stay in a safe location, and their choice not to take a driver who knew the language and country with them. In addition, they may not have known enough about the customs in the rural area.

== Impact ==
The killings happened on the fifth anniversary of U.S. troops invading Afghanistan. Fischer and Struwe were the first foreign reporters killed in Afghanistan since late 2001. In all, eight journalists died in Afghanistan in 2001. After the event, officials from Afghanistan condemned the attack and expressed concerns about the safety of journalists in Afghanistan.

Monika Harms, the Attorney General of Germany, opened a federal case and recalled the bodies for an autopsy in Germany. The bodies were sent from Baghlan to Kabul and handed over transferred to German authorities at the embassy there.

== Reactions ==
The Taliban denied any involvement.

Koïchiro Matsuura, director-general of UNESCO, released an official statement, which said: "I condemn the murder of Karen Fischer and Christian Struwe. It is essential that journalists, whether Afghan or foreign, be able to carry out their professional activities safely. Their ability to exercise their basic human right of freedom of expression is essential to the establishment of democracy and rule of law in Afghanistan."

German Foreign Minister Frank-Walter Steinmeier also condemned the murders, saying "This heinous crime must be solved and the perpetrators brought before justice."

The two journalists were killed on the same day as Russian journalist Anna Politkovskaya, which remains a high-profile international case of a journalist killed for her reporting.

== See also ==
- List of journalists killed during the War in Afghanistan (2001–14)
