= Paul McGeough =

Irish-Australian journalist

Paul McGeough is an Irish-Australian journalist and senior foreign correspondent for The Sydney Morning Herald.

In 2001, when covering events in Afghanistan with the Northern Alliance, he and French journalist Véronique Reyberotte survived an attack by the Taliban which killed journalists Volker Handloik, Johanne Sutton, and Pierre Billaud. He was awarded the 2003 Walkley Award for Journalism Leadership in recognition of acts of courage and bravery in the practice of journalism.

== Detainment in Israel ==
In 2010, McGeough travelled on a Gaza-bound flotilla, reporting for The Sydney Morning Herald and Brisbane Times from aboard the MV Samoud (also known as the MV Challenger I). When Israeli forces boarded the flotilla's vessels on 31 May, McGeough and Herald photographer Kate Geraghty were among those detained. In an audio transmission sent shortly before the MV Samoud was intercepted, he said:

"At 4.20(am local time) (11.20am Sydney time) we realised all communications on the boat were jammed, 4.22 (am) – we see two zodiacs moving in, pressing through. Two more zodiacs. Now there are five of them astern of us. There's white wakes on black water. Search lights on one of the cargo ships and from the Turkish ferry are picking up the zodiacs now."

The following day, Fairfax confirmed that McGeough had, along with Geraghty, been detained by Israel in the city of Beersheba. According to the Herald's editor Peter Fray, McGeough turned down the option of being deported immediately, in return for signing a form in which he would have admitted entering Israel illegally. When meeting with Australian and Irish consular officials in Beersheba's Ela prison, McGeough told them that he intended to challenge attempts by Israeli authorities to deport him.

However, Australia's Department of Foreign Affairs and Trade and the Herald confirmed on 3 June that both McGeough and Geraghty had been taken to Ben Gurion International Airport in Tel Aviv to be deported. McGeough said that he had left "on legal advice that we will be able to appeal our deportation in absentia".

Speaking to the Herald from Istanbul, McGeough described his treatment as "an absolute disrespect by Israel", accusing Israeli authorities of "a total disrespect to the fundamentals of democracy, and the fundamentals of the rights of journalists under the Geneva Convention".

== Awards ==
- 2003 Walkley Award for Journalism Leadership and the 1997 Graham Perkin Australian Journalist of the Year.
- 2010 Douglas Stewart award and Book of the Year for "Kill Khalid" at the 2010 New South Wales Premier's Literary Awards

== Works ==
- Infernal Triangle Conflict in Iraq, Afghanistan and The Levant – Eyewitness reports from the September 11 decade, Allen & Unwin, 2011, ISBN 978-1-74237-563-2
- Kill Khalid: Mossad's failed hit ... and the rise of Hamas, Allen & Unwin, 2009, ISBN 978-1-74175-600-5
- Manhattan to Baghdad : despatches from the frontline in the War on Terror, Allen & Unwin, 2003, ISBN 978-1-74114-025-5
- In Baghdad: a reporter's war, Allen & Unwin, 2003, ISBN 978-1-74114-219-8
- Mission impossible: the sheiks, the U.S. and the future of Iraq, Black Inc., 2004, ISBN 978-1-86395-165-4

== Reviews ==
- Kill Khalid (Foreign Affairs): "gem of leave-no-stone-unturned reporting".
- Kill Khalid (Washington Post): "... timely and thorough examination of Hamas, highlighting the ways in which Israel has intentionally and unintentionally aided its rise."
