= Ulf Strömberg =

Swedish journalist

- Born: 4 November 1959
- Died: 26 November 2001 (aged 42); Taloqan, Afghanistan
- Cause of death: Rifle shots
- Occupation: Cameraman
- Television: TV4
- Spouse: Angela G. Strömberg
- Children: Isabelle, Christoffer & Jennifer Strömberg

Ulf Strömberg, sometimes anglicised as Stroemberg, (4 November 1959 – 26 November 2001) was a Swedish cameraman for Sweden's TV4, who was shot and killed by robbers in Taloqan, Takhar Province, Afghanistan while covering the War in Afghanistan in 2001.

== Personal ==
Ulf Strömberg was married and the father of three children, two daughters and a son.

== Career ==
Strömberg was initially employed for a TV4 affiliate in Uppsala, Sweden and then joined the national network in 1998. Strömberg's last position was as a photojournalist in Paris with correspondent Elisabet Frerot for TV4.

== Death ==
While covering the War in Afghanistan, Strömberg was staying in a house in Taloqan with other Swedish journalists. At around 2 a.m. on 26 November 2001, Aftonbladet's reporters Martin Adler and Bo Lidén were robbed by armed men (moore boys at the age 14,15 ) in uniform who had invaded the house. The men stole medicine, money, computers, as well as other equipment like phones, from them. From the next room, Strömberg open the door for the men, and they opened fire with Kalashnikov rifles and shot him while his colleague, Rolf Porseryd, approached the door. Ulf Stromberg was hit in the chest just above the left nipple. There were no doctors in site. "Aftonbladet's" journalist Bo Lidén received by his wife, in contact with the thorax clinic in Helsingborg (Sweden), who gave instructions to the three Swedish journalists. But they did not manage to save him. Strömberg died twenty minutes later as a result of the shooting. At the time, Strömberg was covering the war with TV4 journalist Rolf Porseryd. In 2006, Adler, a colleague and witness to the murder of Strömberg, was killed in Mogadishu, Somalia.

== Context ==
The Fall of Kabul on 12 November had taken place two weeks before Strömberg's murder and there was confusion and disorder as the Taliban fled. Four journalists had been killed on 19 November 2001.

Strömberg was an early press casualty, the eighth, in the War in Afghanistan, and one in a series against Western reporters in that region. Journalists were concerned about their safety as the fleeing Taliban left a lawlessness in the north in their wake that was an additional concern in covering warfare.

== Impact ==
Ulf Strömberg was one of only few Swedish journalists killed abroad since 2000. Nils Horner was the last Swedish journalist killed and he was also killed while reporting in Afghanistan in 2014. In 1979, Swedish journalists Arne Lemberg and Karl Bergman were killed in Uganda.

== Reactions ==
At the time, Sweden's Prime Minister Göran Persson responded to Strömberg's murder. Former TV4 coworkers Johan Fredriksson and Martin Gustafsson displayed a handwritten sign on the glass doors of the Inter-Continental Hotel in Kabul reading "Bad News" shortly after Strömberg's death. The TV4 staff were gathered for an emergency meeting to hear the announcements of Strömberg's murder.

In 2002, UNESCO named Myanmar's Aung San Suu Kyi a laureate, and it also named honorable mentions, including Ulf Strömberg and other journalists who had been killed in Afghanistan while reporting.

== See also ==
- List of journalists killed during the War in Afghanistan (2001–present)
