= Maria Grazia Cutuli =

Italian reporter (1962–2001)

- Born: 26 October 1962; Catania, Italy
- Died: 19 November 2001 (aged 39); Surobi District, Kabul, Afghanistan
- Cause of death: Murdered
- Education: University of Catania
- Occupation: Journalist
- Years active: Over 11 years
- Employer: Corriere della Sera

Maria Grazia Cutuli (26 October 1962 – 19 November 2001) was an Italian journalist who worked as a reporter with the daily newspaper Corriere della Sera. She was killed while on assignment in Afghanistan where she was covering the US military invasion following the terrorist attacks on 11 September 2001. She was murdered between Jalalabad and Kabul with three other journalists. Cutuli was the first female and first Italian journalist to be killed during the War in Afghanistan in 2001.

== Personal ==
Maria Grazia Cutuli was born and raised in Catania, Sicily, but later she resided in Milan as a professional journalist. She studied philosophy and graduated from the University of Catania. She took up residence in Milan by 1990.

== Career ==
Maria Grazia Cutuli worked as a journalist for over 11 years. She first worked for the newspaper La Sicilia, at first writing theater reviews, and in local broadcast news. She wrote for magazines, such as Epoca and Panorama. She traveled to Israel, Cambodia, Sudan, Rwanda and South Africa and wrote freelance articles to build her credentials as a foreign correspondent. She worked for Corriere della Sera since 1997. After her murder in Afghanistan, she was elevated to "Special Correspondent" by Corriere della Sera.

== Death ==
Maria Grazia Cutuli was murdered along with Spanish war correspondent Julio Fuentes of El Mundo, and Australian Harry Burton and Afghan Azizullah Haidari, who both worked for Reuters. They were murdered about 90 kilometers from Kabul near Sarubi, located in the Nangarhar Province, on 19 November 2001, as the group travelled between Jalalabad and Kabul. Her autopsy revealed that she had died from 4 gun shot wounds to the back and it confirmed her earlobe had been cut off, which was done by her murderer for jewellery.

A group of journalists had left in a small convoy of about 8 cars from Jalalabad and were en route to Kabul. The first several cars of the convoy were stopped near a bridge by armed, Pashto-speaking men who identified themselves as Taliban. When rock throwing and shooting ensued, the 4 cars in the rear turned and escaped back to Jalalabad. Before she was killed, Cutuli was raped by the later convicted murderer Reza Khan.

On the same day of her death, her last article in Corriere della Sera was published, called "A deposit of nerve gas in the base of Osama." That story was filed earlier but reported on the discovery of a chemical factory that posed a threat during the war.

== Legal proceedings ==
Reza Khan testified that the Taliban ordered the murder of journalists. Other independent sources at the time implicated the Taliban.

In 2004 Reza Khan was convicted in Kabul for the murders and also rape, as well as additional crimes against Afghan nationals. He was sentenced to death in November 2004. Two Afghani brothers were also implicated and convicted in the murder of the other journalists in 2005. Khan was executed by gunfire in October 2007 at the same time that 14 others were executed, including the convicted murderers of her colleagues.

== Context ==
The group of journalists was killed within a week of the fall of the Taliban during a period of time when other journalists were also targets.

== Impact ==
Maria Grazia Cutuli became a hero in Italy after her murder. Her funeral service in Catania at Sant'Agata Cathedral in her native region of Sicily was attended by around 5,000 people. The Cutuli Onlus Foundation was formed in March 2008 in her birth city of Catania. A school for immigrants was also founded in her hometown. A national journalism award was created in Italy that carried the name of Cutuli.

== Reactions ==
Among those who reacted to the murder of Cutuli was the Italian President Carlo Azeglio Ciampi and Prime Minister Silvio Berlusconi.

== See also ==
- List of journalists killed during the War in Afghanistan (2001–present)
