= Jo van den Hoven =

Dutch footballer

Personal information
- Full name: Joannes Simon Henricus van den Hoven
- Date of birth: 30 October 1911
- Place of birth: Tilburg, Netherlands
- Date of death: 23 November 2001 (aged 90)
- Place of death: Tilburg, Netherlands
- Position: Defender

Senior career*
Years	Team	Apps	(Gls)
1931–1937	TSV LONGA		

International career
1937	Netherlands	1	(0)
- * Club domestic league appearances and goals

Jo van den Hoven (30 October 1911 – 23 November 2001) was a Dutch footballer. He played in one match for the Netherlands national football team in 1937. In July 1999 he became the then oldest living Dutch international player after the death of Henk Pellikaan.

Born in Tilburg, Van den Hoven played for hometown club LONGA in the 1930s.
