= Stephen Farrell (journalist) =

Irish and British former journalist

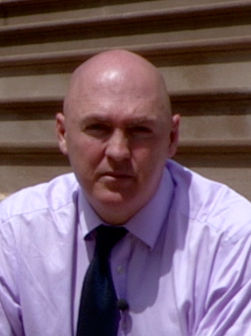
- Born: 1962 (age 63–64); London
- Occupation: Think-tank
- Notable credit(s): The Times; The New York Times; Reuters; Chatham House

Stephen Farrell is a former journalist who is now Head of News and Comment for the Chatham House international affairs think-tank in London. He holds both Irish and British citizenship. Farrell worked for The Times from 1995 to 2007, reporting from Kosovo, India, Afghanistan and the Middle East, including Iraq. In 2007, he joined The New York Times, and reported from the Middle East, Afghanistan and Libya, later moving to New York and London. In 2017, he joined Reuters, working as bureau chief in Jerusalem until Jan. 2022. He then worked in Ukraine and London. In May 2025, he joined Chatham House, the Royal Institute of International Affairs.

== Early career and The Times ==
Farrell studied English Language and Literature at Edinburgh University before becoming a journalist on a London local newspaper, a news agency and then the now-defunct Today newspaper, for which he reported from Britain, Northern Ireland and the Balkans.

After Today ceased publication in 1995, he joined The Times, working as a news reporter on stories such as the Dunblane school massacre in Scotland, the death of Diana, Princess of Wales, in Paris and the conflict in Kosovo. He became The Times's South Asia correspondent in 2000, based in New Delhi and reporting from Afghanistan under Taliban rule, Pakistan, India, Sri Lanka and Myanmar. From 2001 to 2007, he was Middle East correspondent, covering the Israeli-Palestinian conflict and the 2003 invasion of Iraq and its aftermath.

In April 2004, while on assignment for The Times, he was kidnapped by Sunni insurgents during the First Battle of Fallujah. He was freed unharmed after eight hours of captivity.

== The New York Times ==
In July 2007, Farrell joined The New York Times, initially as a correspondent in Baghdad, and later as a foreign correspondent reporting in print and video across the Middle East, including Libya, the Tahrir Square protests in Cairo and Jordan.

In 2007, he was part of the NYT's Baghdad bureau, which won the Overseas Press Club of America award for best web coverage of international affairs, for the multimedia feature "Assessing the Surge: A Survey of Baghdad Neighborhoods". The bureau's staff were finalists in the 2008 Pulitzer Prize for International Reporting.

From 2008, Farrell wrote the Baghdad Bureau blog which was renamed as "At War" in 2009 and expanded, becoming "a reported blog from Afghanistan, Pakistan, Iraq and other conflicts in the post-9/11 era". Farrell ran the at War blog from the field from 2009 until early 2012.

On 5 September 2009, while Farrell and his interpreter Sultan Munadi were in a village south of Kunduz, Afghanistan, investigating reports of civilian casualties in a NATO strike on two fuel tankers that had been hijacked by the Taliban they were kidnapped. On 9 September, four days after the kidnap, a British Army raid rescued Farrell. Corporal John Harrison, a British soldier from the 1st Battalion, The Parachute Regiment, Special Forces Support Group and Farrell's interpreter, Sultan Munadi were killed. During his captivity, media organizations imposed a news blackout on his kidnapping, similar to that which had taken place during the kidnapping of fellow New York Times journalist David Rohde a few months earlier, for fear that media attention would increase the risk to the captives. Prior to his kidnap Farrell had ignored repeated warnings that it was too dangerous to travel to the site and was later criticized for his actions which cost the life of one of the soldiers involved in his rescue.

After the rescue, The New York Times's public editor, Clark Hoyt, questioned Farrell and Times editors about the incident for a column headlined 'Calculations of War: Which Risk Is Reasonable?' Hoyt quoted Bill Keller, the then executive editor, saying "I have seen no evidence that his reporting mission was reckless or irresponsible". Hoyt said Farrell denied assertions that he ignored repeated warnings, writing: "Farrell told me the only warning he got came from a policeman who said it would not be safe to go to the scene of the airstrike because darkness was approaching" and that he did not go there until the next morning. Hoyt concluded, "I cannot make the judgment – as so many do without all the facts – that Farrell acted recklessly." He added: "independent reporting is often the only way to uncover truths that governments and militaries do not want the public to know, like the carnage from airstrikes."

Farrell was detained again in Libya in March 2011. The New York Times reported on 18 March 2011 that Libya had agreed to free him and three colleagues: Anthony Shadid, Lynsey Addario and Tyler Hicks. Farrell was released on 21 March 2011, along with all of his colleagues.

Farrell was part of the NYT reporting and graphics team which won Society for News Design and Malofiej awards for 18 Days at the Center of Egypt's Revolution, a graphic map of the February 2011 Egyptian protests in Cairo's Tahrir Square. The map was updated throughout the demonstrations, which led to the fall of President Hosni Mubarak.

Farrell joined the NYT in New York in October 2012. He was a member of the NYT video journalism unit which won an online 2013 National Edward R. Murrow Award for its breaking news coverage of the impact of Hurricane Sandy on New York. In 2016 he moved to the NYT's London bureau to work on the digital news desk, on the team developing a new design for the Times's website and mobile phone app.

== Reuters ==
In December 2017, Farrell joined Reuters news agency as a writer and video journalist and moved to Jerusalem as Bureau Chief for Israel and the Palestinian Territories, overseeing text, pictures and television. In early 2022, he moved to London and in 2024, he shared the Reuters award Editor of the Year.

== Chatham House ==
In May 2025, he joined the London-based international affairs think-tank as Head of News and Comment.

== Other writing ==
In March 2010, Farrell co-authored a history of Hamas, titled Hamas: The Islamic Resistance Movement, with a British academic, Beverley Milton-Edwards. In 2024, after the October 7 2023 attacks on Israel by Hamas and other Palestinian militant groups, the book was revised and updated as Hamas: Quest for Power. The updated edition included excerpts from a lengthy interview Farrell conducted in Gaza in 2011 with Yahya Sinwar, a senior Hamas leader who went on to be one of the masterminds of the 2023 attack.

== See also ==
- List of kidnappings
- List of solved missing person cases (2000s)
