= László Móra =

Hungarian equestrian

Personal information
- Nationality: Hungarian
- Born: 14 December 1934; Budapest, Hungary
- Died: 3 November 2001 (aged 66); Hamburg, Germany

Sport
- Sport: Equestrian

László Móra (14 December 1934 – 3 November 2001) was a Hungarian equestrian. He competed at the 1960 Summer Olympics and the 1972 Summer Olympics.
