= Paul Theisen =

Danish fencer (1922–2001)

Personal information
- Full name: Paul Albert Theisen
- Born: 15 June 1922 Copenhagen, Denmark
- Died: 27 November 2001 (aged 79)

Sport
- Sport: Fencing

Paul Theisen (15 June 1922 – 27 November 2001) was a Danish fencer. He competed in the team sabre event at the 1952 Summer Olympics.
