= Harry Burton (journalist) =

Australian journalist

- Photo taken at Mount Martha, Victoria
- Born: 23 January 1968; Brisbane, QLD, Australia
- Died: 19 November 2001 (aged 33); Afghanistan
- Occupation: Journalist

Harry Burton (23 January 1968 – 19 November 2001) was an Australian journalist and cameraman who was kidnapped by the Taliban on the highway to Kabul, Afghanistan and then murdered. Three other journalists suffered the same fate.

Burton, 33 years old when he was killed, was a latecomer to journalism and quit his job three years earlier in Melbourne to get involved in the profession. A scholarship fund was set up in his name by the Jakarta Foreign Correspondents Club to support training for reporters from remote parts of Indonesia, particularly camera operators.

== Biography ==
Burton was born in Brisbane and studied agricultural sciences at what was Dookie Agricultural College later to become part of the University of Melbourne.

He had worked in Indonesia earlier in 2001 covering the Free Aceh Movement and the conflict in East Timor for the Reuters agency. He decided to go to Jakarta without any previous experience and try his hand at becoming a photo journalist. Prior to that he worked as a Quality Manager for Coles Myer. His breakthrough came in his coverage of the final months of the Indonesian occupation of East Timor that August. He ran the Reuters television bureau in Dili after the former Portuguese colony voted for independence.

He was one of 19 journalists briefly detained in the Fiji coup of 2000. After his release he was made a full-time cameraman by Reuters in January 2000.

== Death ==
Burton moved to Afghanistan to cover the ongoing conflict there, working for Reuters at the time. In November of that year he was riding in a Jeep from Jalalabad to Kabul, just a few days after the Taliban fell, when his convoy was stopped and passengers ordered to get out. He was killed with three other journalists, Julio Fuentes of the Spanish paper El Mundo, Azizullah Haidari of Reuters, and Maria Grazia Cutuli of Italy's Corriere della Sera. Their mutilated bodies were found on 19 November. Burton was buried in Hobart on 28 November 2001.

=== Murder trial ===
A Kabul court sentenced three men to death for these murders in 2004 and 2005 respectively. Two brothers, Mahmood Zar Jan and Abdul Wahid, were sentenced in 2005 and another, Reza Khan, was sentenced to death on 20 November 2004.

== Family ==
Burton's girlfriend was Joanne Collins, who is also a journalist. Burton's father, also called Harry, is a scientist, and his mother, Anne (who predeceased her son) was a social worker. He had four sisters and three brothers.

Harry Burton senior was a judge for the ADF photography award named in his son's honour.

== See also ==
- List of journalists killed during the War in Afghanistan (2001–2021)
