= Werner Hausmann =

Swiss hockey player

Personal information
- Nationality: Swiss
- Born: 31 October 1923 Biberist, Switzerland
- Died: 29 November 2001 (aged 78)

Sport
- Sport: Field hockey

Werner Hausmann (31 October 1923 – 29 November 2001) was a Swiss field hockey player. He competed in the men's tournament at the 1960 Summer Olympics.
