= Tuss =

Tuss is a surname. Notable people with the surname include:

- Miklós Tuss (1898–1978), Hungarian sailor
- Paul Tuss (born 1964/1965), American politician
- Réka Tuss (born 1977), Hungarian alpine skier
- Stefan Tuss (born 1988), German Nordic combined skier

== See also ==
- Duso
- Tusses, an old name for toothing stones
