= Shosh Kormosh =

Israeli photographer (1948–2001)

- שוש קורמוש
- Born: Rosa Perlmutter; 20 January 1948; Regensburg, Bavaria, Germany
- Died: 19 November 2001 (aged 53); Tel Aviv, Israel
- Education: HaMidrasha – Faculty of the Arts
- Spouse: Meir Franco

Shosh Kormosh (Hebrew: שוש קורמוש; 20 January 1948 – 19 November 2001) was an Israeli artist known for her hand-processed black-and-white photographs that carried a painting-like sensitivity and delicacy. Her work explored profound themes of bereavement, loss, the memory of The Holocaust, and the pervasive sense of loneliness in an increasingly alienated world.

== Life and education ==
Shosh Kormosh was born in 1948 in Regensburg, Germany. Her family were Holocaust survivors from Poland who emigrated to Israel in 1949. Raised in an environment shaped by the aftermath of the Holocaust, Kormosh grew up deeply aware of the emotional scars borne by survivors, including members of her own family. This early exposure to trauma and memory would later become a central theme in her artistic work.

Between 1981 and 1985, Kormosh studied at the Art Teachers' College 'Hamidrasha' in Ramat Hasharon, where she developed a unique approach to photography that blended traditional techniques with experimental processes. Her artistic journey was marked by a desire to push the boundaries of photographic expression.

== Death ==
Kormosh died of cancer in Tel Aviv on 19 November 2001 at the age of 53. Six months later, her husband, Meir Franco, was murdered in the Sinai Peninsula.

== Career ==
Kormosh worked as a photojournalist in Tel Aviv for Ha-ir from 1988 until 1992. She specialized in portrait photography, but also explored dance and theater photography.

Kormosh's work in the late 1980s also explored the reinterpretation of existing photographs, usually drawn from auction catalogs and photography magazines. In her original photographs, Kormosh played with and retouched shadows, creating flat compositions. She also created collage works, combining multiple photographs into one piece.

She returned to HaMidrasha in 1992, where she taught photography for a year. She later taught photography at the Shenkar College of Engineering and Design in 1995.

== Artistic style and themes ==
Kormosh’s photographs often employed distancing and metonymy, creating visual narratives that addressed personal and collective trauma. Her meticulous photographic techniques blurred the lines between photography and other forms of visual art, such as painting and sculpture. Through this approach, Kormosh created images that transcended simple representation, delving into the deeper emotional and philosophical realms of memory and mourning.

The artist Nurit David described Kormosh's work as a "unique attempt by photography to discuss its absence, its innate problem, its variance from painting and sculpture, and its dependence on an object." Kormosh’s compositions frequently featured quasi-bourgeois objects—detached from their original contexts—floating in stark black or white spaces. These surreal elements created a disjointed visual environment, a "non-world" where objects appeared untethered and out of context. This imagery evoked what David described as a "terrible reversal" of Martin Heidegger’s concept of "being-in-the-world."

=== Connection to Holocaust memory ===
As a second-generation descendant of Holocaust survivors, Kormosh's work is often interpreted as a quintessential example of trauerarbeit (the work of mourning). Her photography became a medium for processing grief and the intergenerational transmission of trauma, resonating deeply with Israeli artists and audiences grappling with the memory of the Holocaust.

== Awards and prizes ==
- 1997: Prize for Plastic Arts, Ministry of Education and Culture
- 1999: Eugene Kolb Prize for Israeli Graphic Arts, Tel Aviv Museum of Art

== Selected solo exhibitions ==
- 1993: Shosh Kormosh 1991-1993, The Museum of Israeli Art, Ramat Gan
- 1996: Shosh Kormosh: Works 94-95, Tel Aviv Artists’ Studios, Tel Aviv-Yafo
- 1998: Shosh Kormosh, Moshe Gershuni, Tel Aviv Artists’ Studios, Tel Aviv-Yafo
- 2008: Terms of Stillness: Works 1987-2001, The Open Museum of Photography, Tel-Hai
- 2009: Terms of Stillness: Works 1987-2001, Omer Open Museum, Omer
- 2012: Shosh Kormosh: Works 1987-2001, Gordon Gallery, Tel Aviv

== Group exhibitions (selection in the Field of printmaking) ==
- 1999: Exhibition 25: New Prints, Jerusalem Print Workshop, Jerusalem
- 2008: Flora in the Workshop, Jerusalem Print Workshop, Jerusalem
- 2012: Aspects of Black, Jerusalem Print Workshop, Jerusalem

== See also ==
- Gordon Gallery
