= Roger Tauss =

Swiss slalom canoeist

Medal record

Men's canoe slalom

Representing Switzerland

World Championships
Silver medal – second place	1957 Augsburg	C-2 team

Roger Tauss is a Swiss retired slalom canoeist who competed from the late 1940s to the late 1950s. He won a silver medal at the 1957 ICF Canoe Slalom World Championships in Augsburg.
