= Johanne Sutton =

French journalist (1966–2001)

Johanne Sutton (1 December 1966 – 11 November 2001) was a French radio reporter and journalist.

== Early life and education ==
Born in Casablanca, Morocco, she graduated from the École supérieure de journalisme de Lille in 1990 and began working for Radio France International in 1991. Sutton had covered conflicts in Kosovo, Macedonia, and the Middle East, though she specialized in investigative reporting.

== Death ==
Sutton, along with fellow French journalist Pierre Billaud and German journalist Volker Handloik, was killed in an ambush in Dashti Qaleh, Takhar Province, Afghanistan on 11 November 2001. The trio were travelling on a Northern Alliance armoured personnel carrier when they came under attack by Taliban troops with machine guns and a rocket-propelled grenade launcher. Australian journalist Paul McGeough and French journalist Véronique Reyberotte survived the attack. According to Reyberotte Billaud and Sutton jumped off the tank.

== Reaction ==
Former French president Jacques Chirac and former French Prime Minister Lionel Jospin praised Sutton and Billaud for their courage.

== See also ==
- List of journalists killed during the War in Afghanistan (2001–2021)
