= Herbert Tauss =

American artist (1929–2001)

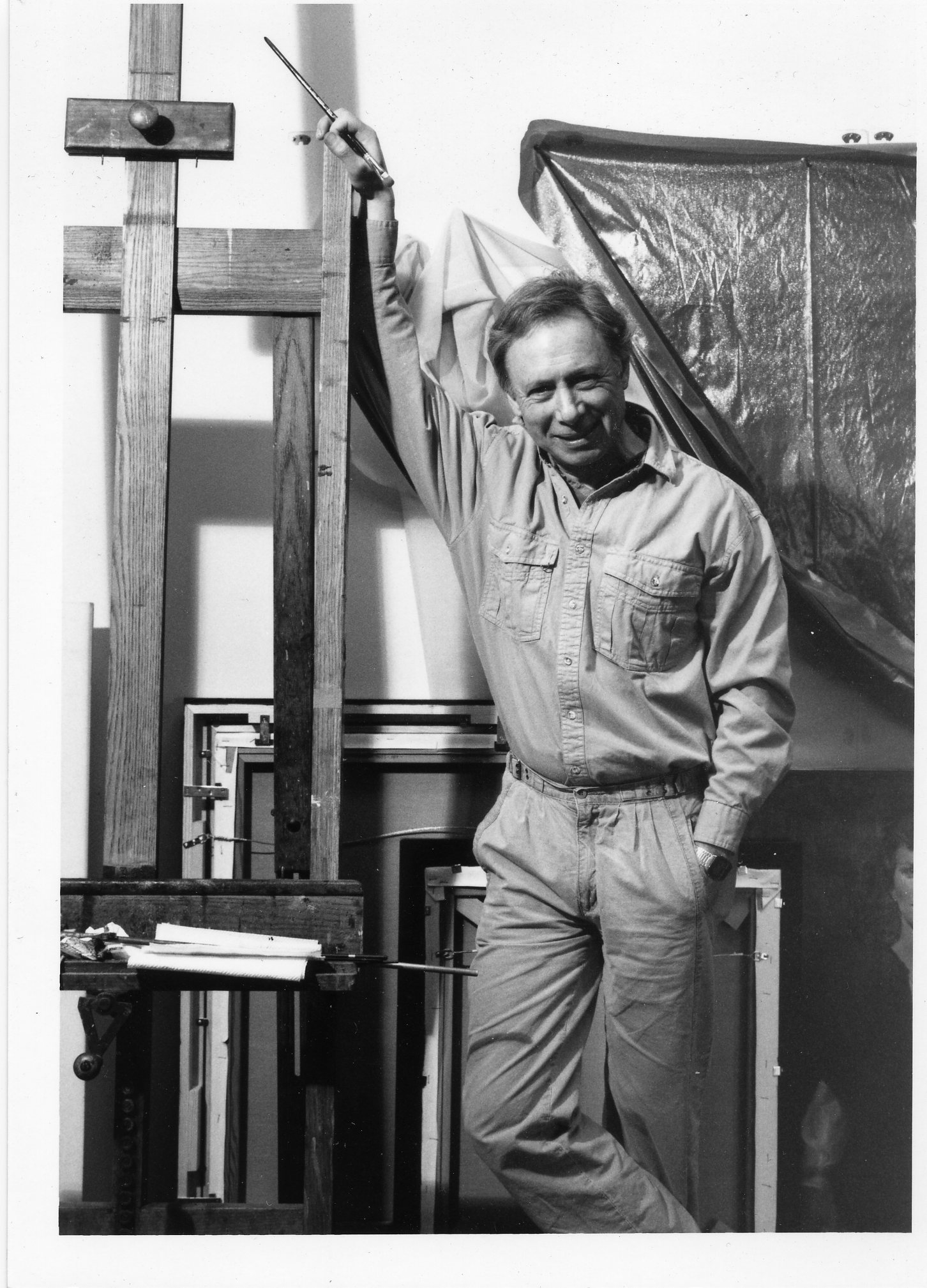
- Herb Tauss in his home studio, Garrison, NY circa 1990
- Born: 31 October 1929; New York, New York
- Died: 14 November 2001 (aged 72); Valhalla, NY
- Known for: Illustrations, Painting
- Spouse: Joan Tauss
- Awards: Society of Illustrators

Herbert Tauss (October 31, 1929 - November 14, 2001) was an American artist, illustrator, and painter.

His drawings, paintings and sculptures have won awards from the Society of Illustrators and the Art Directors Club of New York City. He was inducted into the Illustrators Hall of Fame in 1996. His works are included in the collections of the United States Department of the Interior and his rendering of the Apollo 11 Moon shot was shown in the Smithsonian.

== Biography ==
Herbert Tauss was born in New York City. He attended the High School of Industrial Art, and upon graduating, secured an apprenticeship at the Traeger Phillips Studio. His first illustrations were made in 1949 for Pageant magazine, following by work for other publications which included American Weekly, Argosy, The Saturday Evening Post, Redbook, National Geographic, Parents and McCall's magazines.

He joined the Charles E. Cooper Studio in 1955, and when the illustration markets began to constrict in the early 1960s, he moved to England to work for the British market. He returned to the U.S. in the early 1970s and became prolific in the paperback market when, among other things, he illustrated the series of historical novels, the Kent Family Chronicles, which sold over 40 million copies. He also illustrated several limited edition books for the Franklin Library. Tauss taught at the School of Visual Arts, Pratt Institute, Marymount College and the Fashion Institute of Technology in New York City.

== Bibliography ==
- The Shadow Children
- My Palace of Leaves in Sarajevo
- Us and Them:A History of Intolerance In America
