= Volker Handloik =

German journalist (1961–2001)

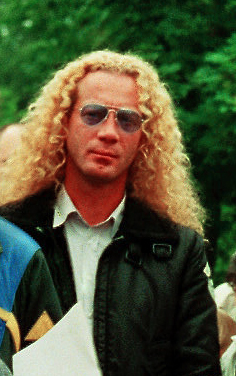
Volker Handloik

Volker Handloik (19 July 1961 – 11 November 2001) was a German freelance journalist and reporter. Born in Rostock, East Germany, he worked for the Hamburg-based Stern for 10 years and also did some correspondence for newspapers, journals, and magazines such as the Frankfurter Allgemeine Zeitung, Süddeutsche Zeitung, taz, Berliner Zeitung, National Geographic, Stern, Focus, mare, Geo, Merian, and the Spiegel Reporter. Handloik, who spoke Russian and Spanish fluently often traveled to the former Soviet republics and to South America and had been working in northern Afghanistan since October 2001.

== Death ==
Handloik, along with French journalists Johanne Sutton and Pierre Billaud, was killed in an ambush in Dasht-e Qaleh, Takhar Province, Afghanistan on 11 November 2001. The trio were travelling on a Northern Alliance armoured personnel carrier when they came under attack by Taliban troops with machine guns and a rocket-propelled grenade launcher. Australian journalist Paul McGeough and French journalist Véronique Reyberotte survived the attack. According to McGeough, Handloik died instantly from a bullet wound to the head.

== Reaction ==
After learning of Handloik's death, Stern's chief editor Thomas Osterkorn remarked

The death of Volker Handloik has left us all speechless. Our sympathy goes out to his relatives and those of the other journalists killed with him.

== See also ==
- List of journalists killed during the War in Afghanistan (2001–2021)
