= Pierre Billaud =

French journalist (1970–2001)

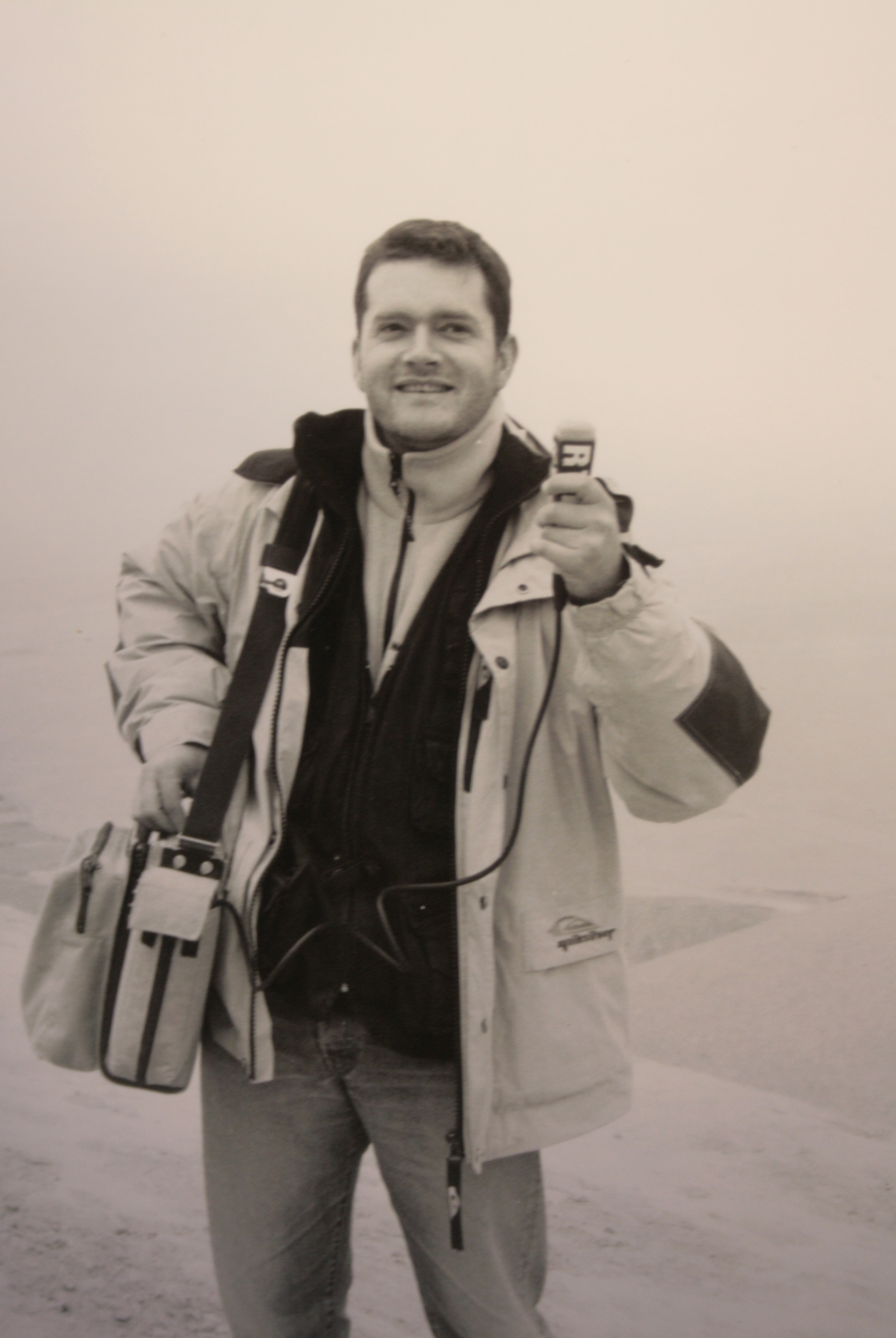
Pierre Billaud

Pierre Billaud (21 May 1970 – 11 November 2001) was a French radio reporter and journalist. He started his career on Radio France then joined Radio Tele Luxembourg as international reporter. He covered the conflicts of Algeria, Israel, Palestine, Bosnia-Herzegovina and Kosovo. Billaud devoted various reports to the situation of children and women in Afghanistan.

== Death ==
Billaud, along with fellow French journalist Johanne Sutton and German journalist Volker Handloik, was killed in an ambush in Dasht-e Qaleh, Takhar Province, Afghanistan on 11 November 2001. The trio were traveling on a Northern Alliance armoured personnel carrier when they came under attack by Taliban troops with machine guns and a rocket-propelled grenade launcher. Australian journalist Paul McGeough and French journalist Véronique Reyberotte survived the attack. According to Reyberotte, Billaud and Sutton jumped off the tank. Former French president Jacques Chirac and former French Prime Minister Lionel Jospin praised Sutton and Billaud for their courage.

== See also ==
- List of journalists killed during the War in Afghanistan (2001–2021)
