= Julio Fuentes Serrano =

Spanish journalist

Julio Fuentes Serrano (11 December 1954 – 19 November 2001) was a Spanish war correspondent for newspaper El Mundo. On 19 November 2001, along with Maria Grazia Cutuli, Italian correspondent from Il Corriere della Sera, Australian cameraman Harry Burton and Afghan photograph Azizula Haidari, he was kidnapped and murdered by the Taliban in the Sarobi area on the highway between Jalalabad and Kabul in Afghanistan.

== Murder trial ==
Reza Khan was convicted of participating in the murders and sentenced to death on 20 November 2004. Two Afghani brothers, Mahmood Zar Jan and Abdul Wahid, were also implicated and convicted in the murders of the journalists in 2005. Khan was executed by gunfire in October 2007 at the same time that 14 others were executed, including the convicted murderers of Fuentes' colleagues.

== See also ==
- List of journalists killed during the War in Afghanistan (2001–14)
