= Teresa Sarti Strada =

Italian teacher, pacifist and philanthropist

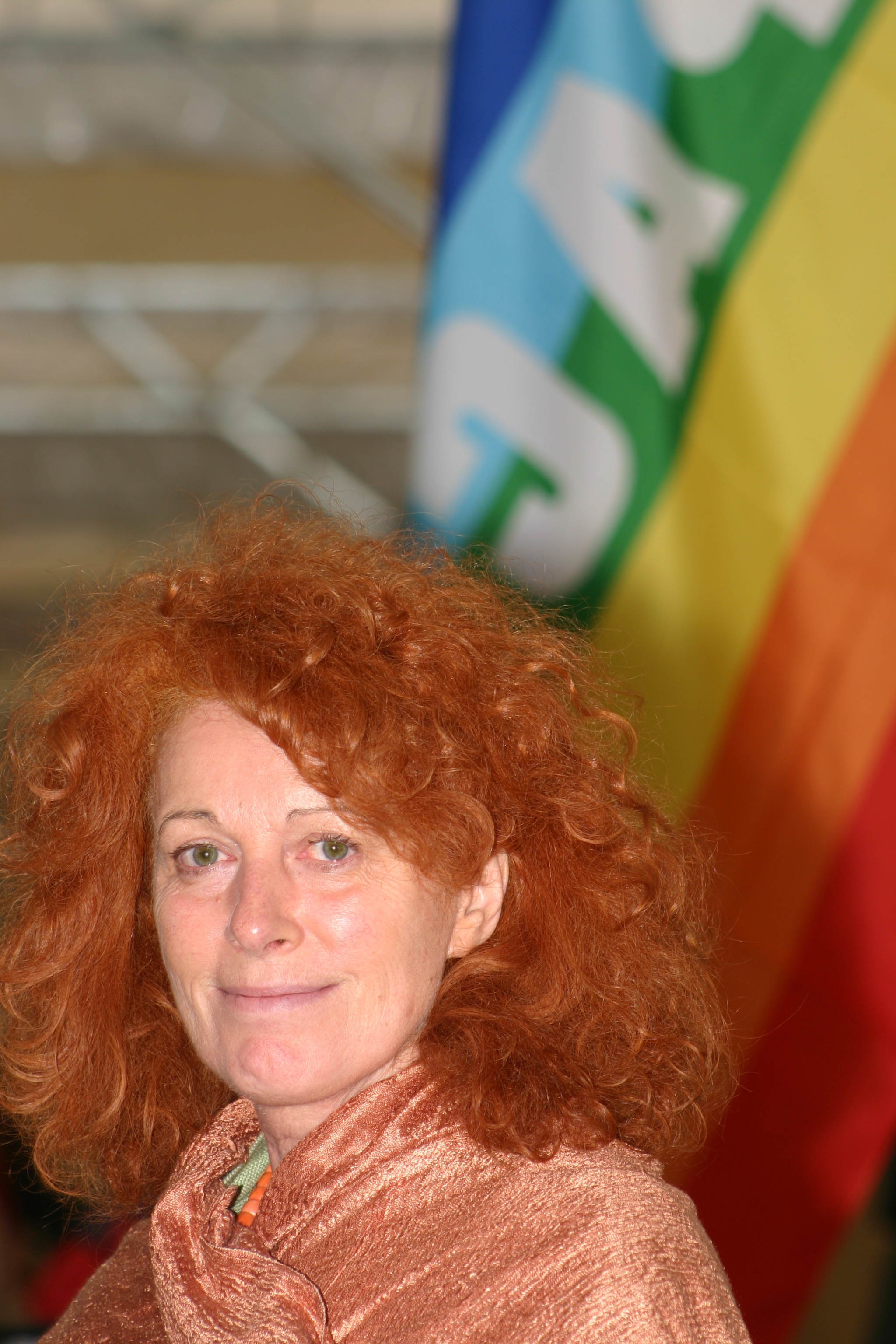
- Sarti in 2004
- Born: 28 March 1946; Sesto San Giovanni, Italy
- Died: 1 September 2009 (aged 63); Milan, Italy
- Education: Catholic University of Milan
- Occupations: Philanthropist, teacher
- Spouse: Gino Strada

Teresa Sarti Strada, née Teresa Sarti (28 March 1946 – 1 September 2009) was an Italian teacher, pacifist and philanthropist who, together with her husband Gino Strada, founded Emergency, an NGO dedicated to providing free medical treatment to victims of war, poverty and land mines. She was the organization's first president.

== Life ==
The youngest daughter of a plumber and housewife, Teresa Sarti was born and raised in Sesto San Giovanni, a working-class suburb of Milan, Italy. The early death of her mother, when her older sisters had left home and married, left her responsible for the care of her father and the family home. In 1968, she graduated in modern literature from the Catholic University of Milan, with a thesis on the teaching of history.

She began her teaching career at Giolli State Middle School, in Bicocca, a neighbouring district of Milan, whose population was mostly made up of poor immigrants from the south of Italy and dominated by organized crime. She continued her teaching career at high schools, first at Agnesi then at Gentileschi. In her teaching she recognised – inspired by Bertolt Brecht's poems translated into Italian by Franco Fortini – that history consisted of more than just the kings, conquerors and powerful people of school history textbooks. (Note: See Bertolt Brecht's poems, notably Fragen eines lesenden Arbeiters ("Questions from a worker who reads").) According to Sandra D'Alessandro, Teresa Sarti was a strict teacher, but was also ready and willing to help students in difficulty, both inside and outside school.

In 1971, she met Gino Strada, who at the time was a student of medicine; the two got married and in 1979 their daughter and only child, Cecilia Strada, was born. She continued to teach history and philosophy in middle and high schools. In 1994, she founded the NGO Emergency together with her husband. (Note: "Emergency just came out of the blue on a New Year's Eve while we were sitting around our kitchen table with some friends and Gino said he wanted to create a small, nimble and independent association to assist civilian war victims", Sarti said, recalling how Emergency was conceived on the last night of 1993. "As a first reaction, we told him he was crazy." (Sarti Strada 2008))

In the fifteen years at the helm of Emergency, she led humanitarian cooperation and health development projects aimed at the construction and management of many hospitals, including a cardiac surgery center of excellence – the Salam Centre for Cardiac Surgery – in Sudan.

She was opposed to all forms of violence (Note: "È il 1968, ma il vento della rivoluzione non la sfiora perché contraria ad ogni forma di violenza." Enciclopedia delle donne) Luigi Iannone described her as "an idefatigable pacifist" who would do everything in her power for human rights and international peace. (Note: "Pacifista instancabile, si spenderà in ogni modo per l’affermazione dei diritti umani e per la pace internazionale." Iannone 2021)

In 2007, she received the Art.3 Award "for her daily commitment to relieve the victims of war and the less fortunate from pain".

She died in Milan from pancreatic cancer, after a two-year illness, on 1 September 2009, aged 63.

On All Souls' Day (2 November) of the same year, at a traditional ceremony presided over by the mayor Letizia Moratti, the name of Teresa Sarti Strada was entered in the Famedio at the cemetery of Lambrate among "the meritorious of the city". On 21 December, her daughter Cecilia was elected to replace her as president of Emergency.

== See also ==
- List of peace activists

== Sources ==
- D'Alessandro, Sandra (n.d.). "Teresa Sarti". Enciclopedia delle donne (in Italian). Società per l'enciclopedia delle donne APS.
- Daneo, Chiara (23 December 2009). "Cecilia Strada è la nuova presidente" [Cecilia Strada is the new president]. Vita (in Italian).
- Iannone, Luigi (13 August 2021). "Teresa Sarti, moglie di Gino Strada: età, Emergency, tumore, morte". CheNews.it (in Italian). "(TBA)"
- Mackinnon, Edward (6 July 2020). "Living in dark times: the poetry of Bertolt Brecht". Culture Matters.
- Mastrogiacomo, Daniele (1 September 2009). "Milano, è morta Teresa Sarti Strada fondatrice e presidente di Emergency" [Teresa Sarti Strada, founder and president of Emergency has died in Milan]. La Repubblica (in Italian). Archived from the original on 30 September 2021.
- Monestiroli, Teresa (6 September 2009). "Milano, l'addio a Teresa Sarti Strada fondatrice e presidente di Emergency" [MILAN – Farewell to Teresa Sarti Strada founder and president of Emergency]. la Repubblica (in Italian). Archived from the original on 21 July 2015.
- "Premio Art. 3" (in Italian). Associazione Art. 3. 2007. "Il Premio Art. 3 per il 2006 è stato assegnato dall' Assemblea generale dei soci dell' associazione alla dott.ssa Teresa Sarti, presidente di Emergency "per il suo quotidiano impegno volto a sollevare dal dolore le vittime della guerra e i meno fortunati, in pieno rispetto e attuazione degli articoli 2, 3, 11 della Costituzione italiana"."
- Sarti Strada, Teresa (18 December 2008). "Teresa Sarti: A former teacher-turned-prominent humanitarian" (Interview). Interviewed by Tiziana Cauli. Devex.
- Satta, Rosalba (2009). "Ciaio Teresa". RosalbaSatta.it. "(TBA)"
- "Ten Years Without Teresa Sarti. She Brought Excellence in Healthcare to Africa with Emergency". Focus on Africa. 1 September 2019.
