= Gabriele Torsello =

Italian photojournalist

Gabriele Torsello (also known as "Kash"; born 12 August 1970) is an Italian freelance journalist and photojournalist based in London who was abducted in Helmand Province, Afghanistan on 12 October 2006. Kosovar businessman Behgjet Pacolli played a major role in negotiating Torsello's release on 3 November 2006. Torsello is a Muslim convert, and author of The Heart of Kashmir.

== Kidnapping ==
Torsello was abducted in Helmand on 12 October 2006 and released on 3 November 2006. He was traveling on a bus from Helmand to Kandahar in southern Afghanistan when he was seized. His translator Ghulam Mohammad was left unharmed.

His captors moved him into a different location: "They arrived and opened the door. One of them grabbed me and took me out without letting me put my shoes on and without blindfolding me, a thing that they always did. He pushed me hard. I had the chains - I couldn't follow him and I had to jump to be able to follow him. I thought they were going to kill me. But they put me in a car instead." He was kept in chains in a windowless room during his captivity, living on a diet of potatoes and Afghan bread dipped in a watery soup.

According to the BBC and consolidated international press reports on a National Union of Journalists Photographers’ blog, Torsello made a telephone call on 12 October 2006 to the director of the hospital in Lashkar Gah confirming that he had been kidnapped and did not know where he was being held. He asked the director to explain to the kidnappers that he was a genuine photo reporter and not a spy. The phone call was eventually cut off, but he was able on a few occasions later to contact the Italian organisation Emergency who ran the hospital.

A press release from Reporters Without Borders quoted Mullah Dadullah, a Taliban military chieftain, who threatened on 4 September 2006 to kill journalists who published news put out by the NATO forces in Afghanistan, as saying "We have an Islamic right to kill such reporters." However, a later report quotes a Taliban spokesman, Qari Yousaf Ahmadi, telling the Afghan news agency Pajhwok that the kidnappers should "free their hostage because it is not fair to hit at Italy by killing an innocent journalist." He added that "the kidnappers are just bandits interested in money." Reporters Without Borders suggest that their original demands might have been just a way of introducing a ransom request. It is possible that the Taliban issue statements such as this to make kidnappings appear to be political rather than an exercise in revenue generation. To confuse the position, the captors are reported to have contacted Emergency and asked, in exchange for freeing Torsello, for the return to Afghanistan of Abdul Rahman, the Afghan citizen who converted to Christianity and who escaped to Italy after he was sentenced to death in March 2006. Furthermore, the Italian press agency AGI on 20 October 2006, quoted Torsello as saying, under duress, "The kidnappers frequently tell me that I am a spy and that British troops bombed Musa Qala and Nawzad districts on my intelligence", but that the abductors, contrary to their previous remarks, distanced themselves from the Taliban and said they were just Muslims fighting foreign occupation in the war-battered country.

On 2 November 2006, 18:00 CET, Italian intelligence agency SISMI – who attempted to negotiate Torsello's release – asked Gigi Moncalvo to make contact with Behgjet Pacolli, an expert in negotiating hostage-taking situations. Throughout the following night, Pacolli began negotiating Torsello's release with an Afghan contact person whom he had already negotiated with in a previous hostage-taking situation in 2004. Eventually, Torsello was released the following day around 10:00 CET near Kandahar. According to Swiss news site tio.ch, Pacolli had to do the terrorists a "non-financial favour“ in return for Torsello's release. Staff from the Emergency aid agency found Torsello on the road a short time later. According to the BBC, a substantial ransom is reported to have been paid to release Torsello, and the governments of Afghanistan and Italy have been criticised for the way they dealt with the Taliban in securing his release and that of other such hostages.

The head of Emergency, Gino Strada, is quoted as saying that the Italian government entrusted US$2 million to Rahmatullah Hanefi, the Afghan director of their hospital in Helmand, to secure the release of Torsello. In a separate hostage negotiation on April 7 for the release of Daniele Mastrogiacomo, the Italian la Repubblica foreign correspondent, and his interpreter and driver, Hanefi was arrested and put in jail in Kabul by Afghan President Hamid Karzai’s government, alleging that Hanefi had played a part in the capture of Mastrogiacomo by the Taliban. Italy's deputy foreign affairs minister, Ugo Intini, confirmed that the Afghan government released five Taliban prisoners to win the freedom of Mastrogiacomo.

== See also ==
- List of kidnappings
- List of solved missing person cases (2000s)
