= Rahmatullah Hanefi =

Afghan human rights worker

- Born: Afghanistan
- Occupations: Humanitarian worker; hospital staff manager at Emergency
- Employer: Emergency (charity)
- Known for: Negotiating the release of Gabriele Torsello (2006) and Daniele Mastrogiacomo (2007)

Rahmatullah Hanefi is an Afghan humanitarian worker known for negotiating the release of Italian hostages Gabriele Torsello in 2006 and Daniele Mastrogiacomo in 2007 while employed by the Italian charity Emergency, where he was the national staff manager of a hospital the charity ran. Hanefi is a citizen of Afghanistan.

== Rescue of Gabriele Torsello ==
Rahmatullah successfully negotiated the release of Gabriele Torsello, an Italian taken hostage in October 2006. The Independent reports that Rahmatullah carried a $2 million ransom to secure Torsello's release. One of Emergency's founders, Gino Strada, confirmed to the Rome prosecutor's office that a €2 million ransom had been paid for Torsello, but stated that Emergency itself had not handled the payment directly.

== Rescue of Daniele Mastrogiacomo ==
Daniele Mastrogiacomo, an Italian journalist, was taken hostage by the Taliban, on March 5, 2007. Rahmatullah was called upon to negotiate his release.

== Captured on suspicions of collusion with the Taliban ==
After Mastrogiacomo's release, Rahmatullah was taken into custody by Afghan authorities, with a spokesman for the Afghan intelligence service claiming that Rahmatullah had played a part in the capture of Mastrogiacomo by the Taliban.

Gino Strada, the founder of Emergency, spoke out on Rahmatullah's behalf:

"These insinuations are completely infamous and unfounded. It's the first time in history that when an exchange of prisoners takes place because the two sides decide to trust someone to carry the operation through that that person is then himself arrested. Two people are responsible for this outrage: Hamid Karzai and Romano Prodi ... I would have expected an immediate declaration of Rahmatullah Hanefi's trustworthiness by the Italian government."

Emergency stated that it withdrew 38 of its foreign aid workers from Afghanistan in protest over Hanefi's continued imprisonment. In May 2007, a solidarity rally for Hanefi was held in Rome's Piazza Farnese.
