= Sesto San Giovanni =

Sesto San Giovanni Sest San Giovann (Lombard)
- Comune
- Comune di Sesto San Giovanni
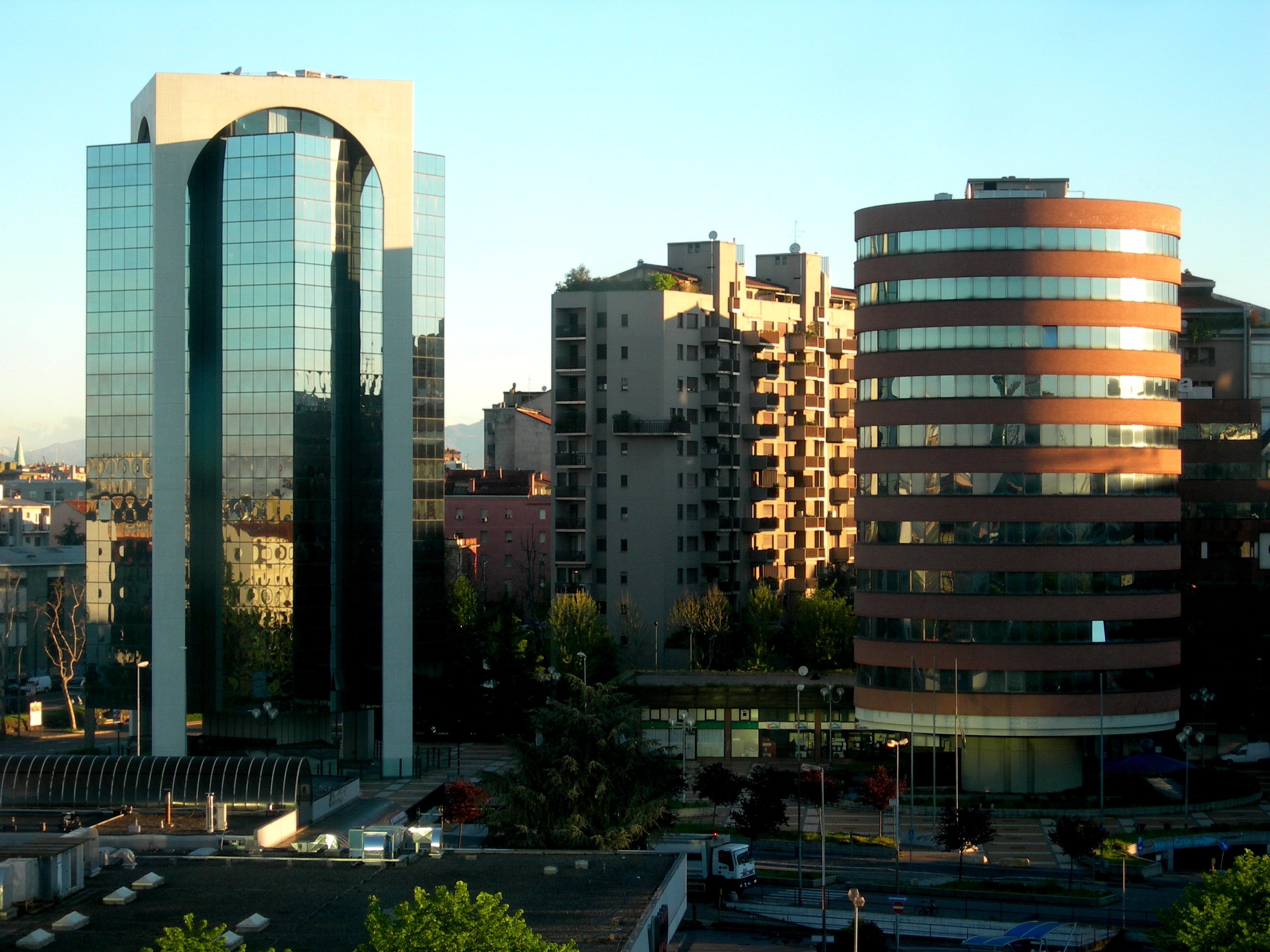
- Piazza Don Mapelli

- Coat of arms

- Location within Italy Location within Lombardy
- Coordinates: 45°32′N 09°14′E
- Country: Italy
- Region: Lombardy
- Metropolitan city: Milan (MI)
- Frazioni: Rondò-Torretta, Rondinella-Baraggia-Restellone, Isola del Bosco-delle Corti, Pelucca-villaggio Falck, Dei Parchi-Cascina de' Gatti-Parpagliona

Government
  - Mayor: Roberto Di Stefano (Center-Right)

Area
  - Total: 11.70 km^{2} (4.52 sq mi)
- Elevation: 140 m (460 ft)

Population (2026)
  - Total: 78,850
  - Density: 6,739/km^{2} (17,450/sq mi)
- Demonym: Sestesi
- Time zone: UTC+1 (CET)
  - Summer (DST): UTC+2 (CEST)
- Postal code: 20099
- Dialing code: 02
- Patron saint: St. John the Baptist
- Saint day: 24 June
- Website: Official website

Sesto San Giovanni (Italian: [ˈsɛsto san dʒoˈvanni]; Western Lombard: Sest San Giovann, Lombard: [ˈsɛst ˌsãː dʒuˈʋan]), locally referred to as just Sesto (Lombard: Sest), is a city and comune (municipality) in the Metropolitan City of Milan in the region of Lombardy in Italy. It has 78,850 inhabitants.

It was awarded with the honorary title of città (city) by decree of 10 April 1954, signed by President Luigi Einaudi.

== History ==
An unimportant agglomerate of buildings until the 19th century, Sesto San Giovanni grew during the end of the 19th century and in the early 20th century, becoming the site of several industries, including companies such as Falck, Campari, Magneti Marelli and Breda. In that period, the population increased rapidly, from 5,000 inhabitants in 1880 to 14,000 in 1911.

In March 1943 workers at the Falck steelworks joined the strike wave spreading from Turin, having been alerted by lorry drivers arriving from Piedmont the day before the planned stoppage.

After World War II, Sesto became populated by many migrants from other parts of Italy, leading to an increased population of 95,000 inhabitants in 1981. Sesto used to be referred to as the "Stalingrad of Italy", due to the strong historical presence of the Italian Communist Party and to its resistance to fascism in World War Two.

Sesto San Giovanni received the honorary title of city by presidential decree on 10 April 1954.

Because of its diverse and growing industries, Sesto has drawn many immigrants. Census statistics from 2016 state that 17% of the population is composed of immigrants.

In the 1990s, Sesto San Giovanni suffered an economic crisis, and most of the larger companies in the town closed their premises. The town partially succeeded in converting its economy from steel production to service industries. Several large companies opened offices in Sesto, such as ABB Group, Wind, Impregilo and Oracle Corporation.

On 23 December 2016, Anis Amri, perpetrator of Berlin truck attack was shot fleeing in the city by the police.

Sesto San Giovanni was previously a left-wing working-class city, in contrast to Milan, which was a more right-leaning (DC, FI, Lega) business city. From 1946 to 2017, all city mayors came from left-wing parties. However, in 2017, it broke the tradition and elected Roberto di Stefano of Lega as mayor, whilst Milan has swung more left-wing in the same timeframe.

== Demographics ==
As of 2026, the population is 78,850, of which 48.5% are male, and 51.5% are female. Minors make up 14.0% of the population, and seniors make up 25.5%.

Historical population

Year	Pop.	±%
1861	4,716	—
1871	5,006	+6.1%
1881	5,456	+9.0%
1901	6,786	+24.4%
1911	13,502	+99.0%
1921	17,781	+31.7%
1931	29,705	+67.1%
1936	35,905	+20.9%

Year	Pop.	±%
1951	44,994	+25.3%
1961	71,444	+58.8%
1971	91,985	+28.8%
1981	95,762	+4.1%
1991	86,657	−9.5%
2001	78,850	−9.0%
2011	76,514	−3.0%
2021	79,442	+3.8%

Source: ISTAT

=== Immigration ===
As of 2025, immigrants make up 18.9% of the population. The 5 largest foreign countries of birth are Egypt, Peru, the Philippines, Romania, and China.

== Sport ==
Sesto San Giovanni is represented by professional football club Pro Sesto 1913, founded in 1913. Having played in the top division in its early years, the club has oscillated between the second and third tiers of the pyramid.

They play at the Stadio Ernesto Breda which they share with local American football players and Inter Milan's women's and youth teams.

== Notable people ==
- Ferdinando Terruzzi (1924–2014), track cyclist
- Nicolás Cotugno (born 1938), former Roman Catholic Archbishop of Montevideo, Uruguay
- Teresa Sarti Strada (1948–2009), co-founder of Emergency
- Gino Strada (1948–2021) war surgeon and founder of Emergency, a UN-recognized international humanitarian organisation that gives free medical treatment to victims of war
- Massimo Carrera (born 1964), footballer and coach
- Lorenzo Bontempelli (born 1965), racing driver
- Marco Saligari (born 1965), cyclist
- Barbara Fusar-Poli (born 1972), figure skater
- Fabio Macellari (born 1974), footballer
- Franco Masetto (born 1942), footballer
- Gianandrea Noseda (born 1964), international symphony conductor
- Sfera Ebbasta (born 1992), Italian rapper

== International relations ==
=== Twin towns – sister cities ===
Sesto San Giovanni is twinned with:

- Saint-Denis, France
- Zlín, Czech Republic
- Goiânia, Brazil

== See also ==
- Islamic Cultural Center Sesto San Giovanni
