= Banga, Entebbe =

Settlement in Uganda

Banga
- Location in Uganda; Placement on map is approximate
- Coordinates: 00°04′53″N 32°27′33″E
- Country: Uganda
- Region: Central Uganda
- District: Wakiso District
- City: Entebbe
- County: Busiro
- Constituency: Entebbe City
- Elevation: 3,810 ft (1,160 m)

Population (2020 (Estimate))
  - Total: 1,000+

Banga is a settlement in the city of Entebbe, in the Central Region of Uganda.

== Location ==
Banga is located in the northwestern part of the city of Entebbe. Katabi is located to the northeast of Banga, Lunyo village is to the southeast and to the South of Banga. The Uganda Virus Research Institute lies to the south and southwest of Banga. The western portion of Banga, adjacent to the waters of Lake Victoria, is called Nakiwogo and is sometimes referred to as Banga-Nakiwogo.

== Overview ==
The majority of Banga residents are self employed. Many run self-owned businesses, including retail shops, barber kiosks, hair salons and mobile money outlets and other similar small scale businesses.

The neighborhood has a number of schools, including Kennedy Nursery and Primary School, Joy School (Infant, Primary and Secondary School classes) and Komo Center School which dedicated to catering for children with autism.

The each in Banga and Nakiwogo is sandy and attracts beach goers and families, particularly on weekends.

In the northwestern part of Banga, the government of Uganda, through the Uganda Ministry of Health, donated land on which the Italian NGO, EMERGENCY built Entebbe Children's Surgical Hospital. The 72-bed facility which was built between 2017 and 2020, opened for patients in April 2021. It caters to patients with surgically correctable disabilities sustained as a result of war, poverty or landmines. Patients are admitted regardless of gender, political orientation, religious beliefs, or ability to pay. Patients have to be less than 18 ears old. Care is totally free.

== Population ==
As of April 2020, the population of Banga, Entebbe was estimated to exceed 1,000 residents.

== See also ==
- List of hospitals in Uganda
