= Cecilia Strada =

Italian philanthropist and essayist (born 1979)

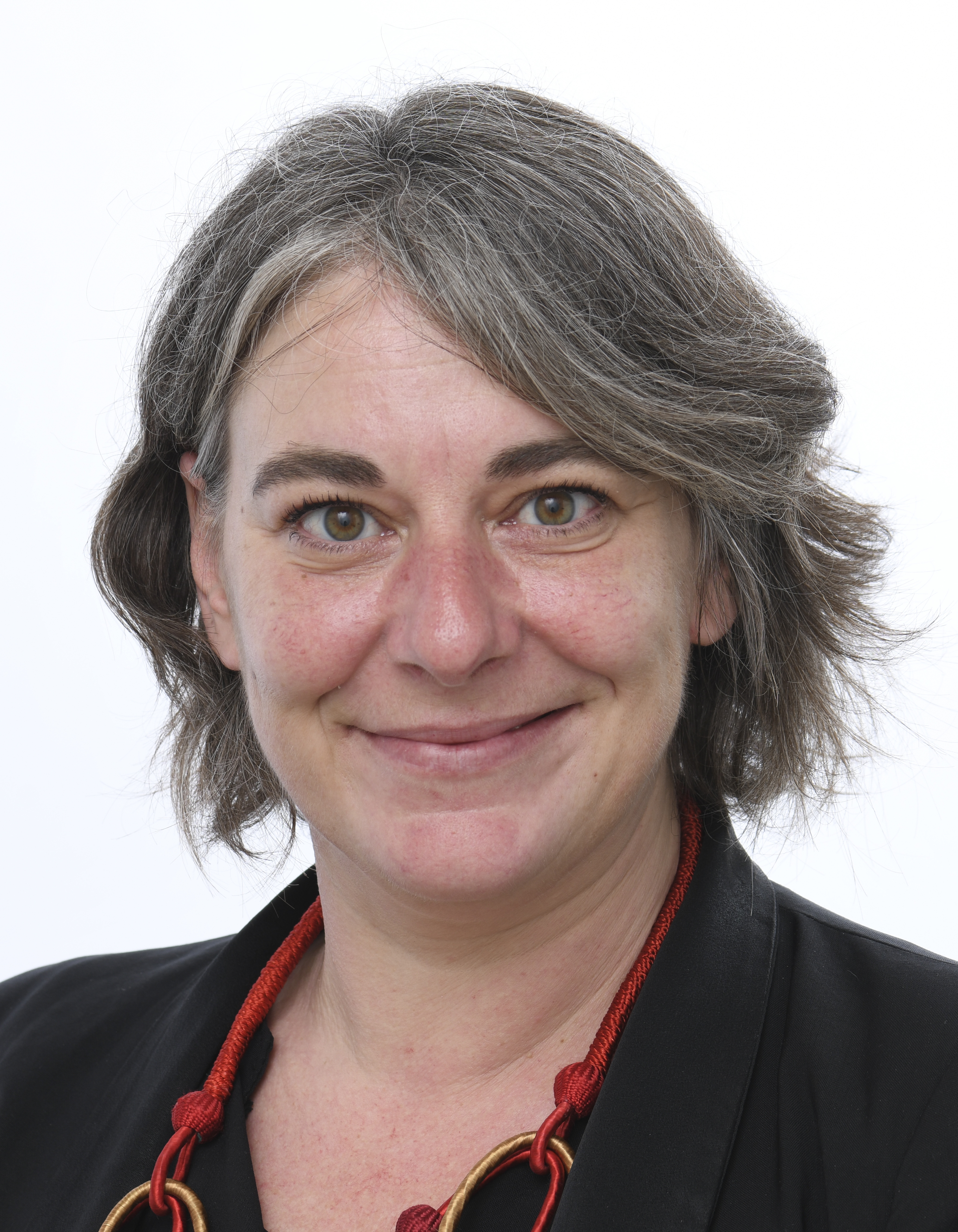
- Official portrait, 2024

Member of the European Parliament
- Incumbent
- Assumed office 16 July 2024
- Constituency: North-West Italy

President of Emergency
- In office 21 December 2009 – 10 July 2017
- Preceded by: Teresa Sarti Strada
- Succeeded by: Rossella Miccio

Personal details
- Born: Cecilia Strada; 12 March 1979 (age 47) Milan, Italy
- Party: PD (2024–present)
- Spouse: Maso Notarianni
- Children: 1
- Parent(s): Gino Strada (father); Teresa Sarti Strada (mother)
- Education: University of Milano-Bicocca
- Occupation: Philanthropist, essayist

Cecilia Maria Strada (born 12 March 1979) is an Italian philanthropist and essayist. She is a former president of the NGO Emergency, which provides free medical treatment to the victims of war, poverty and land mines.

== Life ==
The only daughter of Gino Strada and Teresa Sarti Strada, Cecilia Strada graduated in sociology at the University of Milano-Bicocca. At the age of thirty years, on 21 December 2009, she was elected president of Emergency in place of her mother, who had died the previous September. She held this position until July 2017.

Strada is married to Maso Notarianni and has a son. On 27 June 2021, she announced that she was bisexual.

== Career ==
Internationally engaged, she followed the activities of the various hospitals of the Emergency organization and took care of their relations at the local level, as well as testifying to her experience as journalist and on media. She supports the need for a change in international relations and the need to link the network of commercial relationships with respect for human rights.

In 2018, Strada received the National Culture of Peace Award "for the many activities carried out, for her social work within an association, as well as for the work of information, counter-information and testimony regarding theaters of war and the possible solutions to be adopted. All this has allowed and allows many to know complex realities, to open up different horizons and to create spaces of decisive commitment for the progress of society."

== Sources ==
- Capalbi, Magdalene; Maria, Anna; Barbier, Paul, eds. (2014). Il nostro mondo scritto: antologia poetica [Our written world: poetic anthology] (in Italian). presentation by Cecilia Strada. Milan: La vita felice. ISBN 978-88-7799-617-6.
- "Cecilia Sarti Strada receives the national prize "Culture of Peace - City of Sansepolcro"". La Nazione (in Italian). 22 October 2018.
- "Cecilia Strada è la nuova Presidente di Emergency" [Cecilia Strada is the new President of Emergency]. www.emergency.it (in Italian). 2009. Archived from the original on 10 February 2007.
- "Cecilia Strada racconta "La guerra tra noi" a Ferrara: La testimonianza dell'ex presidente di Emergency in libro presentato all'IBS" [Cecilia Strada tells about "The war between us" in Ferrara – The testimony of the former president of Emergency in a book presented at IBS] (in Italian). estense.com. 5 March 2018.
- Ficocelli, Sara (3 October 2016). "Cecilia Strada: "War makes a lot of money go round but peace would make a lot more go"". La Repubblica (in Italian).
- "Il sindaco ha consegnato a Cecilia Strada le chiavi della nuova sede veneziana di Emergency" [The mayor gave Cecilia Strada the keys of the new Venetian headquarters of Emergency] (in Italian). Municipality of Venice. Archived from the original on 9 October 2016.
- Marino, Patrick (27 June 2021). "CECILIA STRADA FA COMING OUT: "SONO BISESSUALE"" [Cecilia Strada coming out: "I'm bisexual"]. Movieplayer.it (in Italian).
- "Mehr als Heilung: Entwicklungen rund um die medizinische Arbeit eines EMERGENCY-Krankenhauses" [More than healing: Developments around the medical work of an EMERGENCY hospital] (in German). EMERGENCY – Freiwillige aus Berlin und Deutschland. 29 September 2016. Archived from the original on 9 October 2016.
- "Sorpresa a Emergency: silurata Cecilia Strada" [Surprise at Emergency: Cecilia Strada sacked] (in Italian). espresso.repubblica.it. 10 July 2017.
- Strada, Cecilia (2012). Sulla nostra pelle. Le missioni di pace uccidono. Anche quelle italiane [On our skin. Peacekeeping missions kill. Including the Italian ones] (in Italian). Milan: Rizzoli. ISBN 881705711-8.
- Strada, Cecilia (27 August 2016). "Cecilia Strada from Kabul, the wounded man told me: "I thought they were my last moments'"". La Repubblica (in Italian). repubblica.it: L'Espresso Publishing Group.
- Strada, Cecilia (2017). La guerra tra noi [The war between us] (in Italian). Milan: Rizzoli. ISBN 978-88-17-09901-1.
