= Christian Parenti =

American investigative journalist, academic, and author

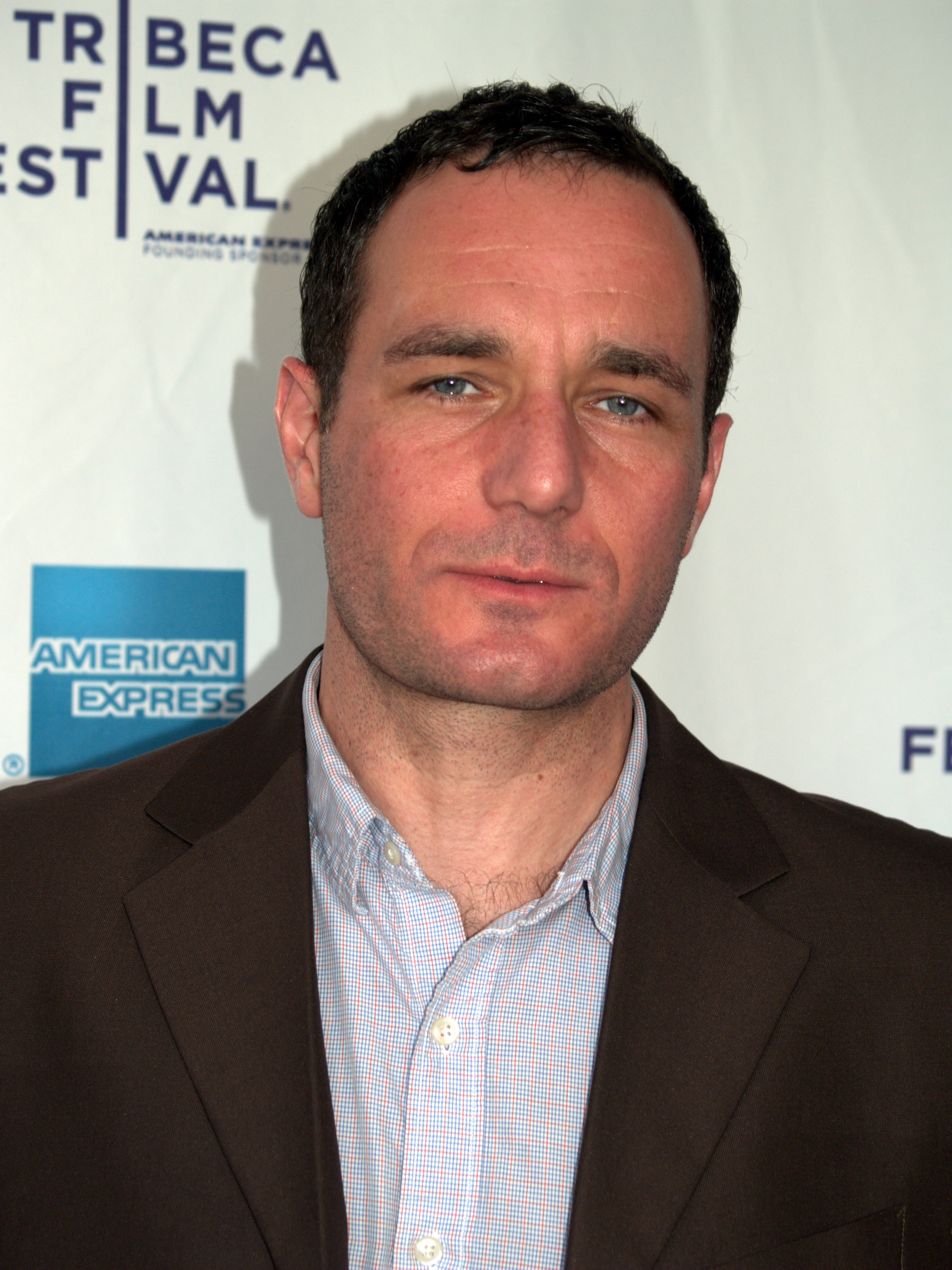
- Parenti at the Tribeca Film Festival, 2009
- Education: The New School for Social Research (BA); London School of Economics (PhD)
- Occupations: Academic, journalist
- Employer: John Jay College
- Political party: Democratic Party
- Spouse: Marcie Smith
- Parent(s): Michael Parenti (father); Susan Parenti (mother)
- Website: christianparenti.com

Christian Parenti is an American investigative journalist, academic, and author.

== Early life and education ==
Parenti is the son of Michael Parenti and Susan Parenti. He attended Buxton School in Williamstown, Massachusetts, The New School for Social Research, and the London School of Economics, where he earned a PhD in Sociology and Geography.

== Career ==
His books include Lockdown America: Police and Prisons in the Age of Crisis (2000), a survey of the rise of the prison-industrial complex from the Nixon through the Reagan Era and into the present, and The Soft Cage: Surveillance in America From Slavery to the War on Terror (2003), a study of surveillance and control in modern society. The Freedom: Shadows and Hallucinations in Occupied Iraq (2004), is an account of the US occupation of Iraq. In Tropic of Chaos: Climate Change and the New Geography of Violence (2011), Parenti argues that climate change is the cause of social and political unrest. Parenti has reported from Afghanistan, Iraq, Venezuela, Bolivia, the Ivory Coast and China, among other locations.

Parenti's reporting in Afghanistan was the subject of an award-winning HBO documentary, Fixer: The Taking of Ajmal Naqshbandi. Directed and edited by Ian Olds, the film follows the working relationship between Parenti and his Afghan colleague Ajmal Naqshbandi, and after Naqshbandi's capture and murder by the Taliban, Parenti's investigation of that crime.

=== Academics ===
Parenti taught at the New College of California from 1997 to 2002 and at St. Mary's College in Moraga, California from 1998 to 2000. He was then a Soros Senior Justice Fellow from 2001 to 2003 and a visiting fellow at CUNY's Center for Place, Culture and Politics from 2002 to 2010. Parenti subsequently taught sustainable development at the SIT Graduate Institute from 2012 to 2014. Since 2017, he has been teaching at John Jay College, where he is Professor of Economics.

== Personal life ==
He divides his time between Brattleboro, Vermont, and New York City.

== Books ==
- Lockdown America: Police and Prisons in the Age of Crisis (1999) ISBN 1-85984-303-4
- The Soft Cage: Surveillance in America From Slavery to the War on Terror (2003) ISBN 0-465-05485-4
- The Freedom: Shadows and Hallucinations in Occupied Iraq (2004) ISBN 1-56584-948-5
- Tropic of Chaos: Climate Change and the New Geography of Violence (2011) ISBN 9781568587295
- Radical Hamilton: Economic Lessons from a Misunderstood Founder (2020) ISBN 978-1786633927

== See also ==
- Free the Slaves
