= Islamic Cultural Center Sesto San Giovanni =

Islamic organization based in Italy

The Islamic Cultural Center Sesto San Giovanni (Centro Culturale Islamico Sesto San Giovanni, also known as Centro Islamico Sesto San Giovanni) was established in Sesto San Giovanni, a commune in the Metropolitan City of Milan, Lombardy, northern Italy. The center’s main goal is to serve the needs of the local Muslim community by contributing to the education of the Muslim citizen, by engaging the youth and by promoting intercultural dialogue. The Islamic Cultural Center Sesto San Giovanni is actively promoting the construction of a new mosque.

== Mission ==
The Islamic Cultural Center Sesto San Giovanni provides support to Muslim families, women and youth. The center also seeks to promote the preservation of the cultural tradition of the Muslim community by encouraging the study of the Arabic language and of the arts expressing that tradition.

The Islamic Cultural Center Sesto San Giovanni adheres to the “Muslims of Europe Charter”, an initiative promoted by the Federation of Islamic Organizations in Europe (FIOE) in the early 2000s and signed by the representatives of Muslim organizations from 28 European states. According to the FIOE’s official website, the Charter aims at “setting out the general principles for better understanding of Islam, and the bases for the integration of Muslims in society, in the context of citizenship.”

== Activities and projects ==
=== Volunteer programs ===
The center encourages volunteer activities in support of the local community. In particular, the center advertises and promotes “OspeDare”, an initiative to help foreign nationals with cultural and/linguistic difficulties to access and benefit from public health services.

=== Cultural and religious events ===
The Islamic Cultural Center Sesto San Giovanni organizes cultural events to discuss and raise awareness of current socio-political events involving the Muslim community worldwide.

In December 2015 the center has sponsored an international workshop on the role of mortmain property (or waqf, a religious endowment in Islamic law) along with the Islamic Research and Training Institute of Jedda and the Awfaq General Secretary of Kuwait.

=== The New Mosque ===
The Islamic Cultural Center of Sesto San Giovanni has actively promoted the construction of a new mosque in Sesto San Giovanni to address the needs of “aggregation and worship” of a growing Muslim community. According to the official website, the project was initially launched in 2009. The commencement of construction works, scheduled for July 2015, has been postponed to early March 2016.

The project is described as the product of a fruitful cooperation between the Muslim community in Sesto San Giovanni and the local administration towards the creation of a space for the meeting, exchange and mutual enrichment of citizens and believers. The new mosque will serve as a multi-functional center, and will provide a site of worship as well as spaces and services to support study and entertainment.

Interviewed by Il Ghirlandaio in 2015, Sesto San Giovanni Deputy Mayor Felice Cagliani emphasized that all citizens willing to respect the rules of the Islamic religion without discriminations will be welcomed at the new center.

The project for the new mosque will be built on a 2500 m² area (26,910 ft²), a plot of land owned by the town administration, for which the Muslim community in Sesto San Giovanni is expected to pay €650,000 ($725,000).

The prayer room, designed to have a 1000-seat capacity, will make the new mosque the largest site of worship in the region.

The project is sponsored by IISI (Istituto Italiano degli Studi Islamici, Italian Islamic Institute for Islamic Studies) and AIICO (Associazione Italiana per l’Insegnamento del Corano, Italian Islamic Association for the Teaching of the Qur'an).

Delegates of the Islamic Cultural Center of Sesto San Giovanni recently presented the project for the construction of the new mosque and multifunctional center at the 2015 Universal Exposition in Milan, in the “Civil Society Pavilion.”

== Funding ==
No information on the Islamic Cultural Center Sesto San Giovanni’s means of funding are available on the center’s website.

According to the website of Qatar’s largest NGO, Qatar Charity, funding for the center was provided by the charity in the framework of its “Ghaith Initiative,” officially launched in 2015 but active over the past 15 years in support of the Islamic presence and culture in Western countries and worldwide.

Through “Ghaith Initiative” Qatar Charity has donated over $6 million to Islamic centers in Italy.

Funds from Qatar Charity will be directed to the construction of the new mosque as well, although no further details are available about the amount of the donation. The new mosque is expected to cost €5 million (about $5,6 million).

The Islamic Cultural Center website features a section dedicated to private donations to support the project.

== Criticism ==
Some of the initiatives of the Cultural Islamic Center Sesto San Giovanni have raised concerns and faced harsh criticism from the local and national community.

Il Ghirlandaio reported that the local community was especially concerned that the center may attract Muslims from all over the region. However, concern was mostly expressed in relation to the center’s affiliation with the Muslim Brotherhood as well as to Qatar’s growing presence in Lombardy.

In particular, the above-mentioned December 2015 event was the occasion for an international gathering of high-profile representatives of the Muslim Brotherhood hosted by Barone dei Sassj Hotel in Sesto San Giovanni. The event was not advertised by Italian Muslim organizations and barely covered by the local press. Valentina Colombo, writing for La Nuova Bussola Quotidiana, remarked that the event took place after British Prime Minister David Cameron released a report on the Muslim Brotherhood’s presence and activities in the UK claiming that association to the organization may be reputed as an indicator of extremism.

By subscribing to the “Muslims of Europe Charter”, the Islamic Cultural Center Sesto San Giovanni reveals its affiliation to the Federation of Islamic Organizations in Europe (FIOE), which expert Lorenzo Vidino described in his book “The New Muslim Brotherhood in the West” as “the overarching organization for new Western Muslim Brotherhood groups in Europe”.

Moreover, Qatar Charity’s financial support to the project of the new mosque offers further reasons for concern. The Consortium Against Terrorist Finance (CATF) reported that the charity has a history of controversial activities, including affiliation and cooperation with extremists and terrorists. CATF stressed that the charity “was named as a major financial conduit for al-Qaeda in judicial proceedings following the attacks on the U.S. Embassies in Kenya and Tanzania”, allegedly supported al-Qaeda operatives in Northern Mali and was “ heavily involved in Syria.” The charity was one of the preferred channeled used by Osama Bin Laden himself to finance terrorist operations worldwide, and was recently accused of being Qatar’s channel to support the genocide perpetrated by the Sudanese government’s militia in Darfur.
