= Franco Masetto =

Italian footballer

Personal information
- Date of birth: July 10, 1942 (age 84)
- Place of birth: Sesto San Giovanni, Italy
- Position: Midfielder

Senior career*
Years	Team	Apps	(Gls)
1960–1961	Internazionale	1	(0)
1961–1966	Del Duca Ascoli	83	(?)
1966–1967	Cagliari	0	(0)
1966–1967	→ Conegliese (loan)		
1967–1969	Cesena	36	(?)
1969–1970	Lucchese	22	(0)
1970–1972	Serenissima San Marino		
1972–1973	Montebelluna		
- * Club domestic league appearances and goals

Franco Masetto (born July 10, 1942 in Sesto San Giovanni) is an Italian former professional footballer.
