= Ian Olds =

American film director

Ian Olds is an American film director. His directing credits include the documentary Occupation: Dreamland, which follows the 1/505 company of the 82nd Airborne Division in Fallujah, Iraq in early 2004 during the Iraq War. Olds also created the documentary Fixer: The Taking of Ajmal Naqshbandi, which depicts the working relationship between American journalist Christian Parenti and his Afghan colleague Ajmal Naqshbandi during the War in Afghanistan.

Occupation: Dreamland won a 2006 Independent Spirit Award. Fixer: The Taking of Ajmal Naqshbandi earned Olds the Best New Documentary Filmmaker award at the 2009 Tribeca Film Festival and won Best Feature-Length Documentary at the 2009 Madrid International Documentary Film Festival. The film was nominated for a 2009 Emmy for Outstanding Investigative Journalism. HBO Documentaries acquired rights to the film.

In 2012 Olds and actor James Franco co-directed the film Francophrenia (or Don't Kill Me, I Know Where the Baby Is), which repurposes footage taken of Franco on the set of the American soap opera General Hospital.

Olds has also directed several short narrative films that were screened at the Sundance Film Festival, the Los Angeles Film Festival, the Rotterdam International Film Festival, and the Clermont-Ferrand International Short Film Festival.

Olds edited Franco’s split-screen feature adaptation of William Faulkner’s novel As I Lay Dying, which premiered at the 2013 Cannes Film Festival.

Olds was awarded a 2013 Guggenheim Fellowship, a 2011 San Francisco Film Society/Hearst Screenwriting Grant, and a 2006 Media Arts Fellowship sponsored by the Rockefeller Foundation.

Olds received his MFA from Columbia University’s Film Division in 2006. He was named one of the 25 New Faces of Independent Film by Filmmaker Magazine in 2009 and was a 2011 Fellow at the Sundance Institute Screenwriters Lab.

== Filmography ==
- Zeroville (2019)
- The Fixer (2016)
- Francophrenia (or Don't Kill Me, I Know Where the Baby Is) (2012)
- Fixer: The Taking of Ajmal Naqshbandi (2009)
- Bomb (2007)
- Occupation: Dreamland (2005)
- Two Men (2005)
