= Entebbe Children's Surgical Hospital =

Pediatric hospital in Uganda

- Emergency
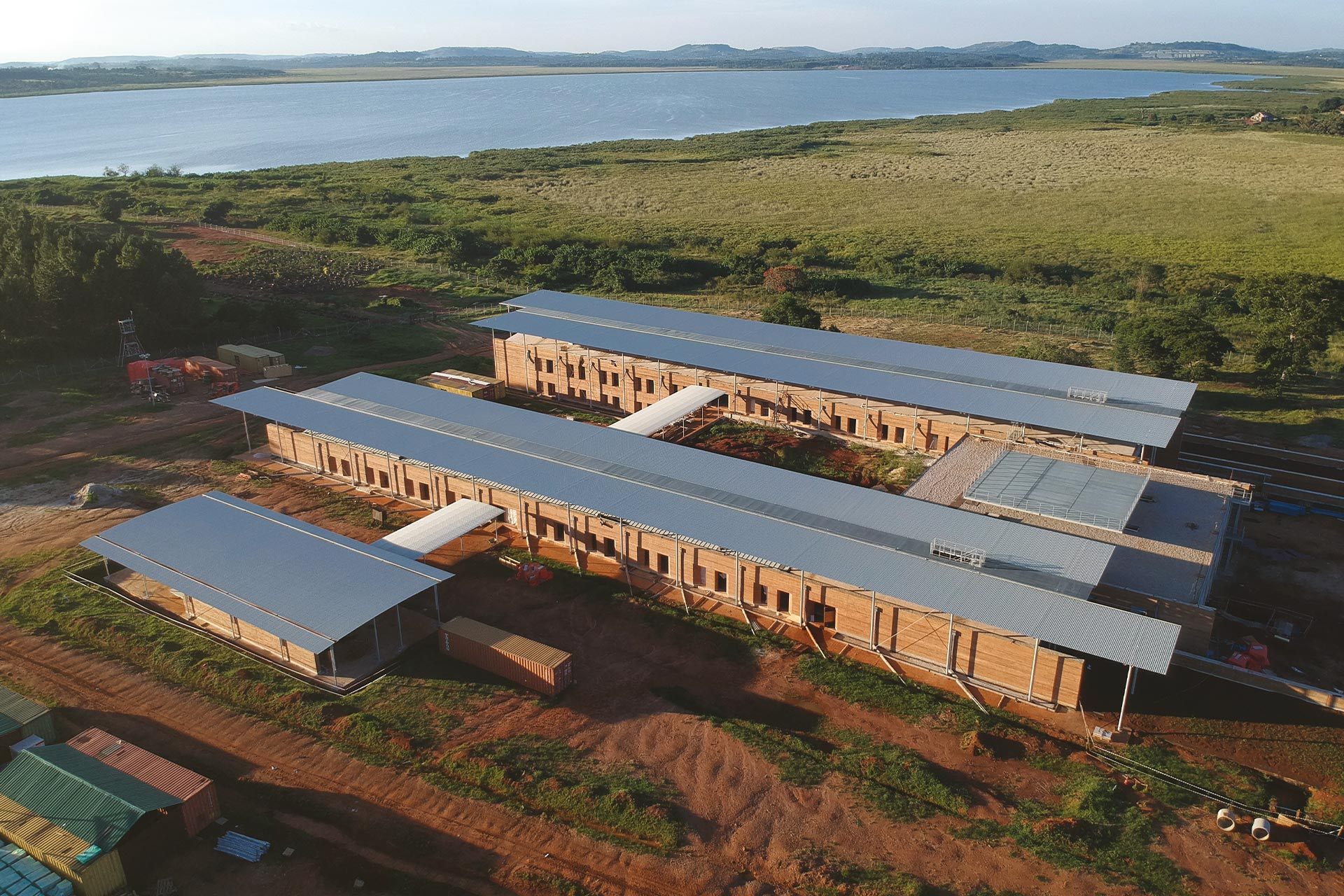
- Entebbe Children's Surgical Hospital during its construction

Geography
- Location: Entebbe, Wakiso District, Uganda
- Coordinates: 00°05′01″N 32°27′28″E

Organisation
- Care system: Free of Charge
- Type: Pediatric Surgery

Services
- Emergency department: I
- Beds: 72

History
- Founded: 19 April 2021

Links
- Website: Homepage
- Other links: Hospitals in Uganda

Entebbe Children's Surgical Hospital (ECSH) is a specialized children's pediatric surgery hospital in Uganda. It is a hospital, owned and operated by Emergency, an international NGO that offers "free medical treatment to the victims of war, poverty and landmines". It also offers free pediatric surgical care to Children from Uganda and across Africa. The Health facility was set to offer surgery services for children with birth defects, urological and gynecological problems, gastrointestinal tract diseases, bile duct diseases as well as cleft clip.

== Location ==
The hospital is located in the village of Banga, in the city of Entebbe, in Wakiso District, in the Central Region of Uganda. This location is approximately 8.9 kilometres (5.5 mi), by road, north of the Entebbe International Airport. ECSH is located approximately 45.5 kilometres (28 mi) south of Mulago National Referral Hospital. The hospital sits on 30 acres (12 ha) of land, donated by the UPDF Special Forces Command.

== Construction ==
The hospital was designed by Renzo Piano and built in association with TAM Associates. The Kampala Post, a Ugandan online publication, reported the construction cost to be USh117 billion in 2021 (approx. €29 million).

== Overview ==
The ECSH is a specialized pediatric surgery hospital owned and administered by Emergency, the international non-government organization (NGO) ECSH serves children with surgical disabilities regardless of their ethnic background, religious affiliation, or ability to pay. Opened on 19 April 2021, the hospital has bed capacity of 72 patients. The Organization offers free medical treatment to the victims of War, Poverty and landmines.

When fully operational, the hospital will employ 385 local people. Of these, 179 (46.5 percent) are medical staff, including technicians, pharmacists, nurses and surgeons. The remaining 206 (53.5 percent) are administrative staff, including social workers, accountants, receptionists, drivers, cooks, security, cleaners and laundry personnel, among others.

At full capacity, the hospital expects to hire 36 expatriate medical staff and 143 Ugandan medical staff. Of the 206 non-medical staff, 196 (95 percent) are expected to be Ugandan and 10 (5 percent) are expected to be expatriates.

== Training ==
One of the hospital's long-term objectives is to train Ugandans, both medical and non-medical. In turn the trained staff will "improve pediatric surgery and medical care in Uganda", and will over time train other workers to do the same.

== Other considerations ==
The Uganda Ministry of Health participated in the planning of this hospital. The Ugandan government donated the land where the hospital was built. The government is also expected to fund 20 percent of the hospital's operational expenses, annually.

== See also ==
- Salam Centre for Cardiac Surgery
- Hospitals in Uganda
- CURE Children's Hospital of Uganda
