= Occupation: Dreamland =

- Promotional poster
- Directed by: Ian Olds and Garrett Scott
- Distributed by: Rumur Releasing
- Release dates: March 11, 2005 (South by Southwest Film Festival); September 23, 2005 (United States)
- Running time: 78 minutes
- Country: United States
- Language: English

Occupation: Dreamland is a "grunt's-eye view," 2005 documentary film focused on a company of the 1/505 of the 82nd Airborne Division in Fallujah, Iraq, in early 2004. It is directed by Ian Olds and Garrett Scott.

The title comes from the nickname of the base, Camp Volturno, on the outskirts of Fallujah. The American soldiers housed there called the place "Camp Dreamland." The film includes interviews with US soldiers, footage of their patrols in Fallujah, as well as interviews with Iraqi civilians.

Garrett Scott died of a heart attack at age 37 in 2005, days before Occupation won the Independent Spirit Award. Ian Olds has written and directed several short fiction films and a documentary about journalists in Afghanistan.

== Synopsis ==
In January, 2004, in Al-Falluja, Iraq, a documentary film crew follows an infantry squad of the 82nd Airborne Division, US Army. Cameras accompany the squad of seven on day and night patrols, as they watch their backs, kick down doors, search for weapons, interrogate women, detain a few people, and listen to the complaints of locals. At their barracks, a former Baathist retreat called Dreamland, the men talk: about why they enlisted, civilian prospects, feelings about the war and Iraqis, where they were when a comrade died a few weeks before.

== Reception ==
On review aggregator website Rotten Tomatoes, the film holds an approval rating of 80% based on 30 reviews, with an average rating of 7.3/10.
