= Life Support (ship) =

European humanitarian ship

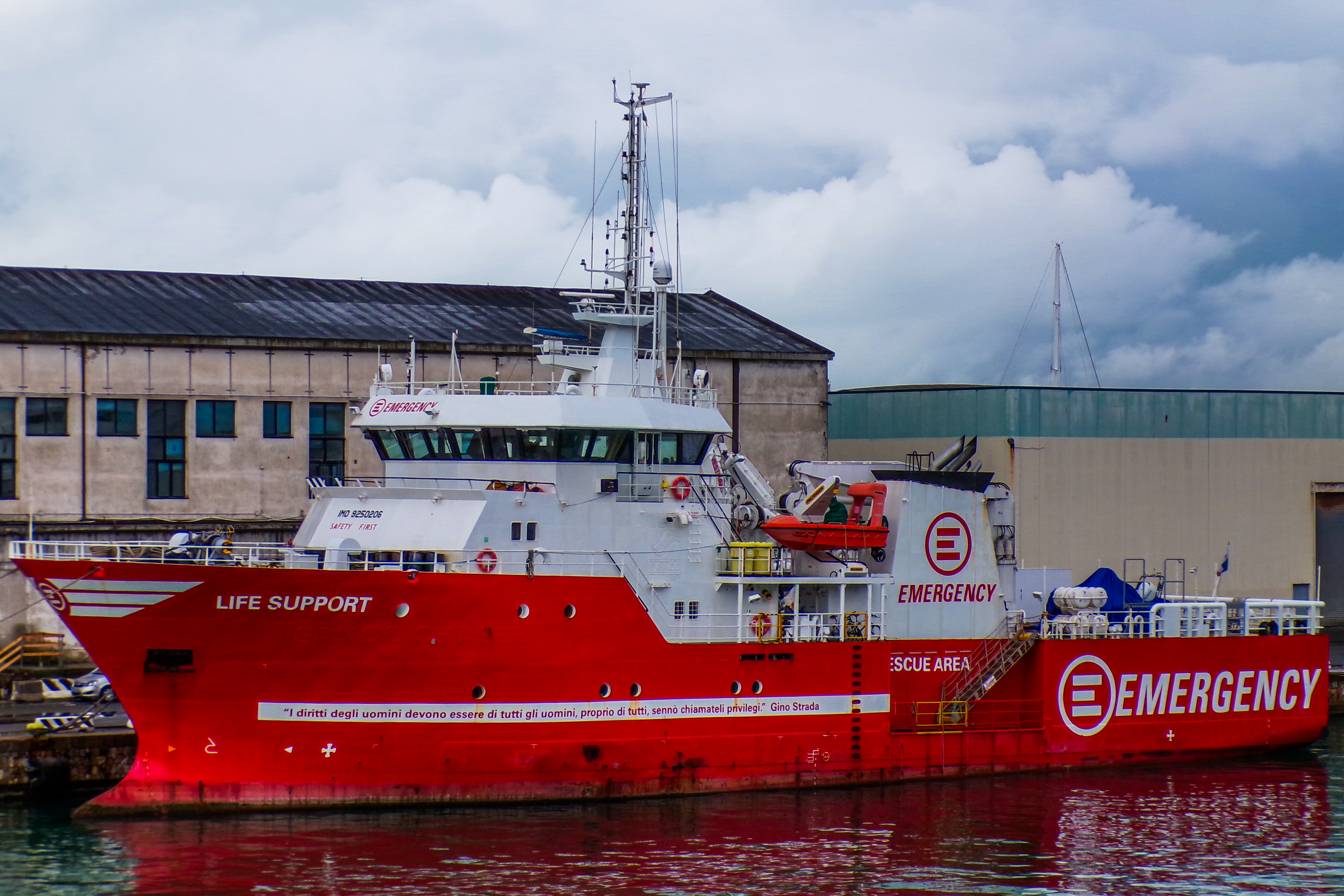
- Life Support in 2025 in Livorno

History
- Builder: Larsnes Mek. Verksted, Norway
- Completed: 2002
- In service: 2002
- Identification: Callsign: HOA7461; IMO:9250206

General characteristics
- Class & type: DNV + 1A1, EO
- Tonnage: 1,346 GRT
- Length: 51.3 metres (168 ft)
- Beam: 12 metres (39 ft)
- Draught: 5.5 metres (18 ft)
- Propulsion: 2 x 6MDZC diesel engines with 1800 hp at 1000 rpm
- Speed: 13 knots (24 km/h; 15 mph)

Life Support is a converted offshore supply vessel operated by the Italian NGO Emergency for Search and rescue of refugees and migrants in the Mediterranean. The ship has been active in this role since December 2022. It has a crew of 28, and can carry up to 175 rescued passengers. On its first mission, it rescued 142 people.

The ship sails under the Flag of Panama.

== History ==
The ship was built in Norway in 2002 as Sanco Chaser for the Norwegian company Sanco Shipping AS. It was used as a supply vessel for seismic evaluation ships, allowing them to stay longer in their area of operation.

In 2022 the ship was sold and converted at the San Giorgio shipyard in Genoa to serve as a rescue vessel for the Italian NGO Emergency. It left for its first mission on 13 December 2022.

On 4 November 2024, Life Support disembarked 72 rescued people at the port of Livorno, bringing the total number rescued by Life Support since December 2022 to 2,293.

In September 2025, Life Support was dispatched to support the Global Sumud Flotilla trying to break the blockade of the Gaza Strip and deliver humanitarian aid to Gaza, which is undergoing famine during the ongoing assumed genocide.

In 2025, by their own account in their report "Contro Corrente" (against the current), the activists on the Life Support picked up 215 migrants from Eritrea, 166 from Bangladesh, 135 from Sudan, 47 from Nigeria and 43 Malians in the Mediterranean and transported them to the European Union.

In early 2026, the activists complained that they are regularly being followed by unmarked vessels. Several rescue attempts in spring 2026 failed, and the migrant boats they were looking for were found empty or empty and half sunk, with the people on board having been taken back to Libya by the Libyan Coast Guard. On 8 April 2026 the activists picked up 71 migrants in international waters and were assigned the Italian port of La Spezia in northern Italy for disembarkation. After disembarking the 71 migrants on 12 April, captain Gabriele Padovan was quoted saying "(...) we wish the newly disembarked people the best for their future", while the ships doctor hoped for the migrants to receive all the physical and psychological care they need in Italy.

On 17 August 2026 the activists spotted a craft on RADAR off the Libyan cost. 50 migrants from Egypt and Somalia were picked up, 7 others had already died due to suffocation while travelling in the boat's hold. The Life Support crew was assigned the port of Bari for disembarkation and arrived on 20 August. The migrants, of whom 31 claimed to be unaccompanied minors, said they had started the crossing in the Libyan town of Zuwarah.

By 28 October 2026 the crew had picked up 113 migrants in two separate operations. Italian authorities ordered the ship on a 4 day trip to Genoa for disembarkation. 8 migrants from Pakistan and Bangladesh were picked up on 16 November 2026.
