= Salam Centre for Cardiac Surgery =

Non-profit surgical hospital in Sudan

Geography
- Location: Khartoum, Sudan
- Coordinates: 15°30′34″N 32°39′48″E

Organisation
- Type: Specialist

Services
- Speciality: Cardiac Surgery

History
- Opened: 2007; 18 years ago

The Salam Centre for Cardiac Surgery is a 63-bed cardiac surgery hospital located on the outskirts of Khartoum, Sudan. The private hospital is operated by Emergency, a humanitarian non-governmental organization, and provides all medical care free of charge. It serves over 50,000 patients every year.

== Overview ==
The hospital is located approximately 12 miles (19 km) southeast of Khartoum, on the west bank of the Blue Nile. The primary operation provided is heart valve repair or replacement due to damage from rheumatic fever and subsequent rheumatic heart disease, which is caused by untreated group A streptococcal infections (strep throat).

The hospital also prioritizes training local staff members as part of the long-term plan to contribute to capacity building in Sudan, and for the sustainability of the facility. It has been accredited by the Sudanese Medical Specialization Board for training cardiologists, intensive care unit nurses, anesthesiologists, cardiac surgeons, and specialist theatre nurses. As of 2014, the government of Sudan was contributing US$2.5 million to the hospital's annual budget, while the remaining was funded by private donors.

== African Network of Medical Excellence ==
The hospital was the first facility in the African Network of Medical Excellence, an initiative by Emergency and several African countries to build and integrate specialized medical centers of excellence across the continent to address regional health needs. Through the Regional Program, which conducts screening missions in neighboring countries to identify people in need of medical care, the Salam Center has treated patients from over 30 different countries.

== Architecture ==
Designed by Studio TAMassociati, the hospital was built out of recycled shipping containers and uses leading climate control technology to insulate, heat and cool the facility, while a solar farm powers the lights and water-heating system; the building won the Aga Khan Award for Architecture in 2013.

It has 63 cardiac beds, three operating theatres, diagnostic laboratories, a staff accommodation unit for 150 staff, and a free guest house for patients’ families.

== Criticism ==
Critics have raised the issue that the millions of dollars that have been poured into the hospital could be better used to improve basic health services which are desperately needed in the area, rather than advanced surgery.

== See also ==
- Entebbe Children's Surgical Hospital
