= Fixer: The Taking of Ajmal Naqshbandi =

2009 film by Ian Olds

- Directed by: Ian Olds
- Release date: 2009
- Running time: 84 minutes
- Country: United States

Fixer: The Taking of Ajmal Naqshbandi is a documentary by Ian Olds that shows the kidnapping of Italian journalist Daniele Mastrogiacomo and his interpreter Ajmal Naqshbandi and the events leading to the release of the former and the murder of the latter by the Taliban.

The Taliban eventually freed Mastrogiacomo on 19 March 2007 in exchange for the release of five Taliban prisoners. Naqshbandi was not released, and on 8 April 2007 he was beheaded.

Olds won Best New Documentary Filmmaker 2009 at the Tribeca Film Festival for the film.

== See also ==
- List of journalists killed during the War in Afghanistan (2001–2021)
