= Studio Tamassociati =

Practice information
- Founded: 1996

Studio Tamassociati is an Italian team of architects based in Venice since 1996. The practice's main architects are Raul Pantaleo (born 1962 in Milan), Massimo Lepore (born 1960 in Udine) and Simone Sfriso (born 1966 in London).

They specialise in sustainable architecture and are frequently involved in social and humanitarian projects. Tamassociati are particularly known for their work for Emergency, an Italian non-governmental organization providing treatment for civilians in war zones worldwide. Tamassociati designed health care buildings for Emergency in Sudan, Sierra Leone, the Central African Republic and Nicaragua. Their Salam Centre for Cardiac Surgery in Khartoum, which opened in 2010, received the Aga Khan Award for Architecture in 2013. - TAM has won other widespread recognition and numerous prizes such as: LafargeHolcim Awards Acknowledgement prize 2017, Middle East Africa; Italian architects of the year 2014; Zumtobel Group Award 2014; Curry Stone Design Prize 2013; Capocchin-G.Ius Gold Medal 2013; Middle East Architect Awards 2010; Smart future minds award 2010; Detail Prize 2009; The Architecture Review Award for Emerging Architecture (UK) 2008.

In 2016 studio Tamassociati has curated the Italian Pavilion at XV International Architecture Exhibition - La Biennale di Venezia. With the exhibition "TAKING CARE – Designing for the Common Good", the TAMassociati curatorial team has developed inside the Italian Pavilion the theme of architecture as a social art and an instrument in the service of the community, ensuring its access to the common goods. The reflection was embodied in an initial theoretical section (“Thinking”). Then a double section in the middle presented good architectural and social practices that give visible form to the idea of the Common Good (“Meeting”). Finally there was an explicit call to action in favor of communities in degraded and marginal areas (“Acting”). The catalogue and the media that recount the curatorial project used original and immediate displays and methods of communication. (http://www.beniculturali.it/mibac/export/MiBAC/sito-MiBAC/Contenuti/MibacUnif/Comunicati/visualizza_asset.html_894085323.html)
