= Daniele Mastrogiacomo =

Italian-Swiss journalist and war correspondent

Daniele Mastrogiacomo (born 30 September 1954) is an Italian-Swiss journalist and a war correspondent for la Repubblica newspaper.

An expert in foreign politics, he began working for la Repubblica in 1980 and has been a special international reporter since 1992. Mastrogiacomo reported on events such as police operation Mani Pulite, the Marta Russo murder and the Priebke affair. He has worked in Afghanistan, Iran, the Palestinian territories, Iraq and Somalia. In 2006, he reported on the Lebanon war.

== Early life ==
Mastrogiacomo was born on 30 September 1954, Karachi, Pakistan.

== Kidnapping ==
On 5 March 2007, Mastrogiacomo along with Afghan journalist Ajmal Naqshbandi, and an Afghan driver, Sayed Agha, was on his way to Taliban-controlled southern Afghanistan after being promised an interview with a Taliban commander. They were kidnapped by senior Taliban militant commander Mullah Dadullah's men. The events that followed are shown in the documentary Fixer: The Taking of Ajmal Naqshbandi and recounted in Mastrogiacomo's book, Days of Fear.

Initially, the Taliban believed Mastrogiacomo was a United Kingdom officer. When it was discovered that he was an Italian reporter, they demanded that Italy withdraw their troops. After Italy had refused, war surgeon and Emergency founder Gino Strada contacted the Taliban in an attempt to free Mastrogiacomo. The Taliban made a video of the Italian journalist Daniele Mastrogiacomo, his driver Sayed Agha and his colleague Ajmal Naqshbandi, kneeling blindfolded before gun-wielding militants. It then showed Agha being beheaded after which a shaken Mastrogiacomo made an impassioned appeal to Italian authorities to "do something," while underlining that the situation was "very difficult".

The Taliban eventually freed Mastrogiacomo in exchange for the release of five Taliban prisoners (including Dadullah's brother Mullah Shah Mansoor and other Taliban commanders), and he returned to his country on 20 March. His first words were, "I hope the Taliban will never return to the Afghanistan government."

Ajmal Naqshbandi was not released, and on 8 April 2007 he was beheaded.

On 12 May 2007, Mullah Dadullah, as well as two of the Taliban commanders who were released in exchange for Mastrogiacomo, were killed in a US-led action. They included Mullah Hamdullah and Mullah Ghafar.

== See also ==
- List of kidnappings
- List of solved missing person cases (2000s)
