= Gino Strada =

Italian physician and activist (1948–2021)

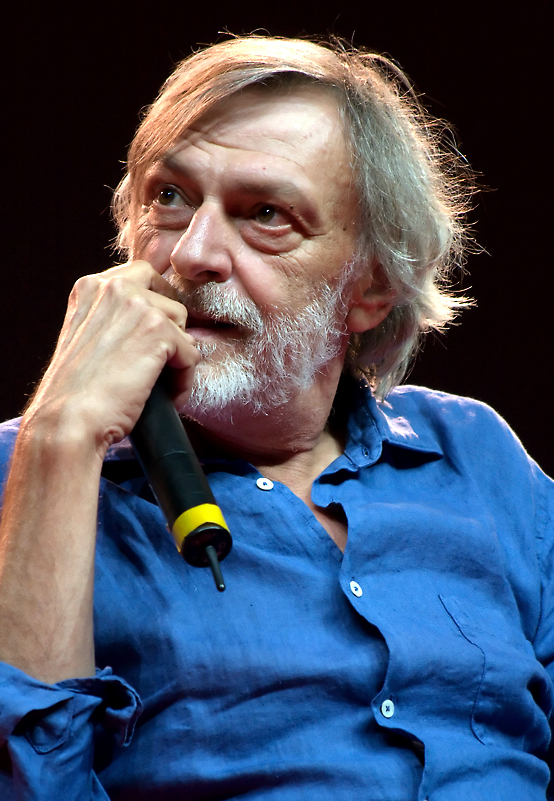
- Strada in 2010
- Born: 21 April 1948; Sesto San Giovanni, Italy
- Died: 13 August 2021 (aged 73); Honfleur, France
- Education: University of Milan
- Years active: 1978-2021
- Known for: Founder of Emergency
- Spouses: Teresa Sarti (m. 1971; died 2009) Simonetta Gola (m. 2021)
- Children: Cecilia Strada
- Medical career
- Profession: Surgeon

Gino Strada (21 April 1948 – 13 August 2021) was an Italian war surgeon, human rights activist, peace activist, and founder of Emergency, a recognized international non-governmental organization.

== Early life and education ==
Gino Strada was born on 21 April 1948 in the Milanese suburb of Sesto San Giovanni. After attending the Giosuè Carducci lyceum, he studied medicine and trauma surgery at the University of Milan and graduated in 1978, specializing in emergency surgery. He then studied and trained as a heart-lung transplant surgeon in several major hospitals abroad, including the Stanford University and the University of Pittsburgh medical centers in the United States and the Groote Schuur Hospital in Cape Town, South Africa.

== Career ==
Strada worked as a doctor at a hospital in Rho near Milan, and soon decided to focus on trauma surgery and the treatment of war victims. In 1988, he began to work as a surgeon with the International Committee of the Red Cross in various conflict zones, including Pakistan, Ethiopia, Peru, Afghanistan, Thailand, Djibouti, Somalia and Bosnia.

In 1994, along with his wife and a group of colleagues, Strada founded Emergency, a medical humanitarian organisation based in Milan. Since then, Emergency has treated millions of patients around the world. Strada's first project under the flag of Emergency was based in Rwanda during the Rwandan genocide in 1994, and he followed this up by launching projects in Iraq, Cambodia, Eritrea and Afghanistan.

Strada's main focus throughout his career was to help victims of war, including direct casualties of conflict and also those who, as a result of war, had no access to healthcare, leaving them vulnerable to preventable diseases.

=== Afghanistan ===
The first Emergency hospital in Afghanistan was set up in 2000 in Kabul after the Taliban turned over a former Soviet-built kindergarten to the organization.

After the United States invasion of Afghanistan, Strada negotiated with the Taliban leader Mohammed Omar when NATO deemed it impossible to deal with the group, in order to operate a hospital behind their frontlines. Strada then opened a new maternity centre in Afghanistan in 2003, which became a reference point in the Panjshir Valley and the surrounding provinces. The centre was recognised by the Afghan ministry of health as a centre of specialisation for gynaecology, obstetrics, and paediatrics. By 2013 Emergency was operating four hospitals and 34 clinics, while the Red Cross had withdrawn 95% of its personnel from the country on the grounds that the war had ended. Since 2001 up to that moment, "NATO forces" had yet to build civilian hospitals in Afghanistan, Strada claimed.

=== Africa ===
In 2007, Strada opened the Salam Centre for Cardiac Surgery in the Sudanese capital of Khartoum, the first hospital in the region to offer free, high-quality cardiac surgery to patients who would have otherwise been unable to access treatment. Strada worked in the centre until 2014, and today it has treated patients from 30 different countries, both within Africa and further afield. The idea for the Salam Centre for Cardiac Surgery came from Strada's belief that the basis for the freedom and quality of human beings with regard to dignity and rights must also extend to the right to free treatment without discrimination: "If you think of medicine as a human right, then you cannot have some hospitals that offer sophisticated, very effective, hi-tech medicine", he says, "and then go to Africa and think, 'OK, here's a couple of vaccinations and a few shots'. Do we think that we human beings, we are all equal in rights and dignity, or not? We say, 'Yes, we are.'" – interview in The Observer, 2013.

This belief also meant that in 2009, Strada contributed to the creation of the ANME (African Network of Medical Excellence), with the aim of promoting the construction of Medical Centres of Excellence across Africa, based on the model of the Salam Centre for Cardiac Surgery. In 2017, construction began on the second centre to form part of the network, the Centre of Excellence in Paediatric Surgery in Entebbe, Uganda, based on a plan drawn up by Strada's friend, Renzo Piano.

== Personal life and death ==
Strada had a heart condition and had undergone a quadruple bypass operation after suffering a heart attack in Iraqi Kurdistan when he and his team came under fire from the forces of Saddam Hussein.

Strada was married to Teresa Sarti, who was co-founder with her husband of Emergency and president of the organization. Together, they have a daughter, Cecilia Strada (b.1979), a journalist. Shortly after Teresa's death in Milan on 1 September 2009, Cecilia was elected to take over as president of Emergency.

Strada married Simonetta Gola, Emergency's communications manager, in June 2021. On 13 August 2021, he died of a heart attack while on vacation in Rouen, France, at the age of 73.

== Notable views ==
- "If any human being is, in this precise moment, suffering, or ill, or hungry, that is something that should concern all of us because to ignore the suffering of a person is always an act of violence, one of the most cowardly."

== Books ==
- Pappagalli verdi: cronache di un chirurgo di guerra, 2000, ISBN 88-07-17032-9.
- Buskashi. Viaggio dentro la guerra (A Journey inside war), 2003, ISBN 88-07-17069-8.
- Gino Strada, Howard Zinn Green Parrots. A war surgeon's diary, 2004, ISBN 88-8158-524-3.
- Gino Strada, Howard Zinn Just war, 2005, ISBN 88-8158-572-3.

== Awards and honours ==
- In 2001, Strada received the journalistic prize Golden Doves for Peace awarded by the Italian Research Institute Archivio Disarmo.
- Asteroid 248908 Ginostrada, discovered by Italian amateur astronomer Vincenzo Casulli in 2006, was named in his honor. The official naming citation was published by the Minor Planet Center on 2 June 2015 (M.P.C. 94391).
- In 2015, Strada was awarded the Right Livelihood Award
- In 2016, Strada was named as a co-recipient along with Sakena Yacoobi of the Sunhak Peace Prize.

== See also ==
- List of peace activists
