= Emergency (organization) =

International medical NGO

EMERGENCY
- Formation: 1994; 32 years ago
- Founder: Gino Strada
- Type: International medical NGO
- Headquarters: Milan, Italy
- Location: Afghanistan, Eritrea, Iraq, Italy, Sierra Leone, Sudan, Uganda
- President: Rossella Miccio
- Website: en.emergency.it

Emergency (stylized as EMERGENCY in all caps) is a humanitarian NGO that provides free medical treatment to the victims of war, poverty, and landmines. It was founded in 1994. Gino Strada, one of the organization's co-founders, served as EMERGENCY's Executive Director. It operates on the premise that access to high-quality healthcare is a fundamental human right.

The organization has treated over 12 million patients since its inception, and has active operations in Afghanistan, Eritrea, Iraq, Italy, Sierra Leone, Sudan, and Uganda.

Projects usually involve the construction and operation of permanent hospitals, as well as training of local staff. The original aim was to bring free, high-quality medical assistance to war victims. Over time, their projects assumed a broader view, now providing specialist and ongoing medical care in locations that require these facilities and expertise.

EMERGENCY was recognized as a non-profit organization in 1998, and received jurisdictional approval as a non-governmental organization in 1999. It has been an official partner of the United Nations Department of Public Information since 2006, and a special consultant for the United Nations Economic and Social Council since 2015.

== Activities ==
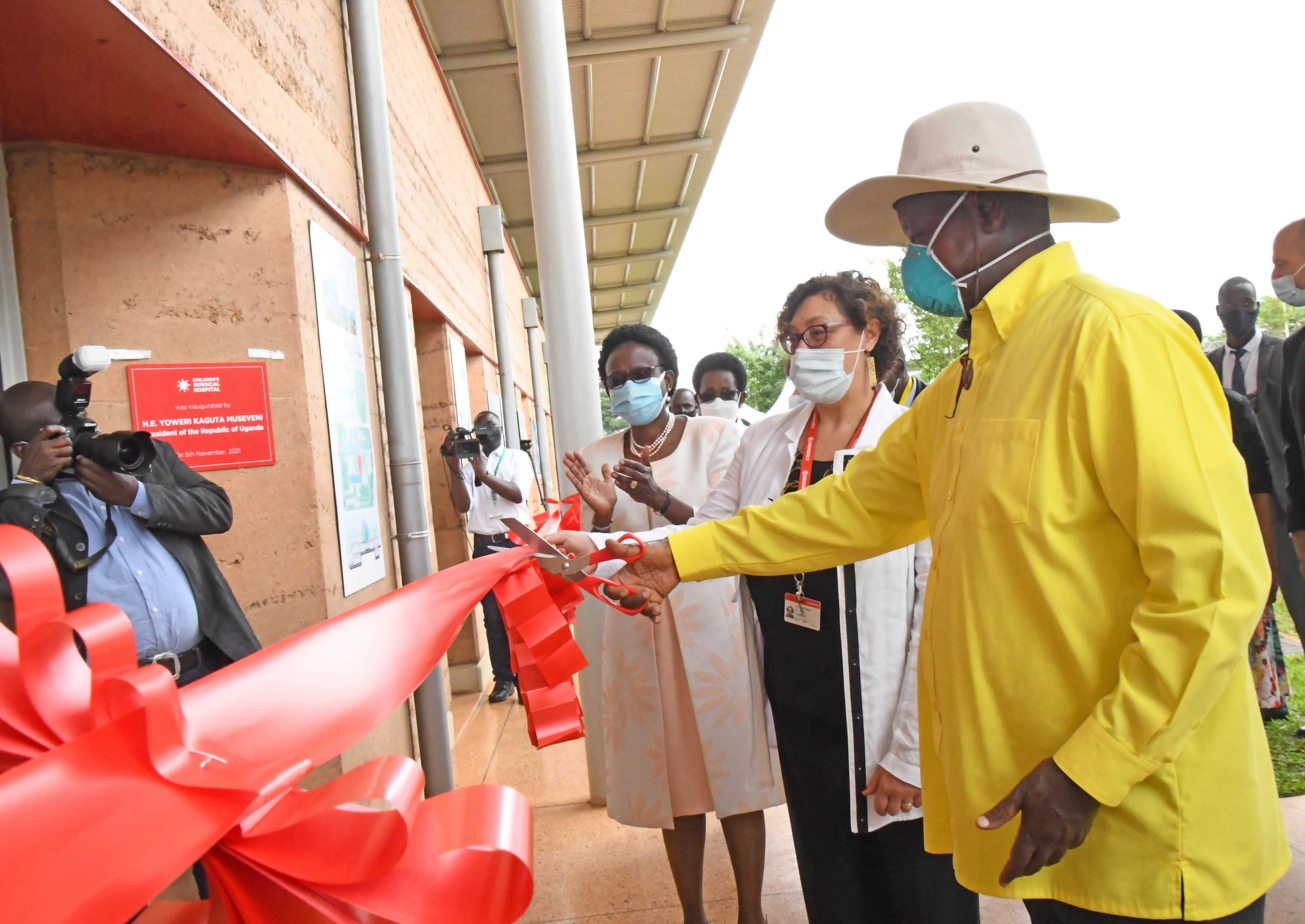
President Museveni commissioning the EMERGENCY Children's Surgical Hospital in Entebbe

=== General operations ===
EMERGENCY begins operations in a specific region or country based on the need for specialized medical assistance, and the absence of similar humanitarian projects in that country. Once a project is initiated, specialized international personnel construct and operate high-quality facilities, as well as first aid posts, and health centers for basic medical assistance. The organization also deals with endemic diseases such as polio and malaria and provides basic health care in these circumstances, as well as establishing social development projects, not only in war-torn areas, but also in high poverty regions. Since 2005, it has worked in Italy to provide healthcare to marginalized groups and communities.

The organization builds and manages:

- Hospitals specifically dedicated to war victims and surgical emergencies;
- Physical and social rehabilitation centers;
- First aid posts for emergency treatment and to refer patients to surgical centers;
- Healthcare centers for primary medical assistance;
- Pediatric clinics;
- Maternity centers;
- Outpatient clinics and mobile clinics for migrants and people in need;
- Centers of medical excellence

==== Local Staff ====
The aim of its projects is to transfer long-term project management to local healthcare authorities, as long as high-quality and free assistance are guaranteed. The organization has employed thousands of local staff in the countries they operate to cover both medical and non-medical positions. The organization provides both theoretical and practical training and considers this an integral part of its programs.

==== International branches ====
EMERGENCY has offices and affiliates in Belgium, Switzerland, the UK and the USA.

=== Current projects ===
==== Afghanistan ====
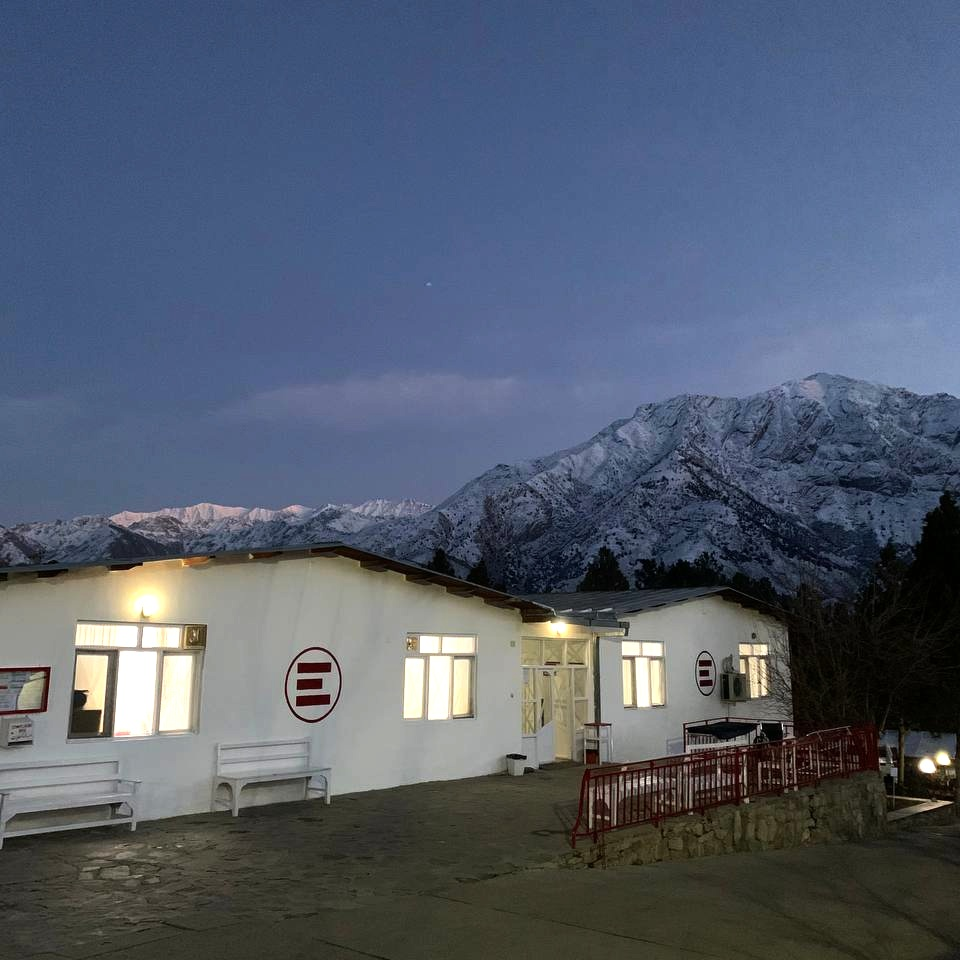
Emergency building in Anabah, Afghanistan, with Hindu Kush mountains in the background.

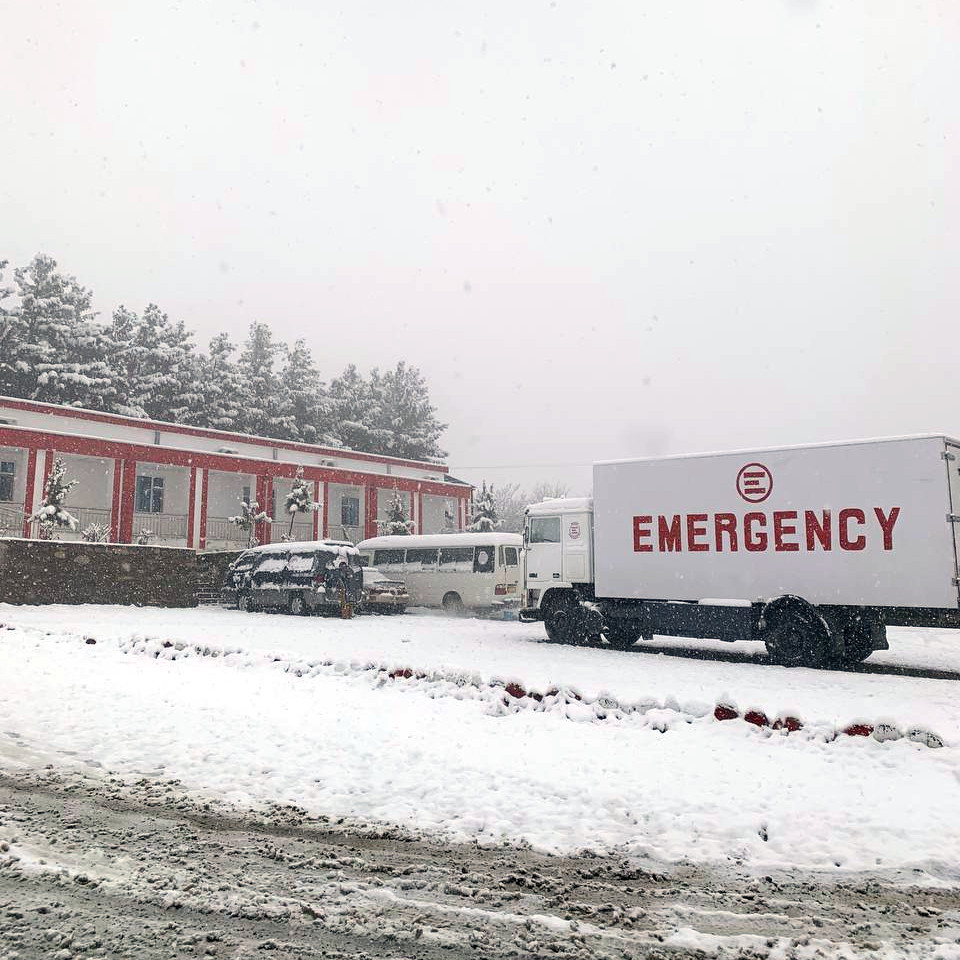
An Emergency supply lorry under the snow in Anabah, Afghanistan

The organization has been working in Afghanistan since 1999, where it has treated more than 8 million patients. EMERGENCY runs a Surgical Center for victims of war and landmines in Kabul, the capital. It runs a Surgical Center in Lashkar-Gah; the only free, specialized facility in the Helmand Province and in the remote areas, surrounding it with first aid posts. It operates two centers in the district of Anabah, Panjshir Valley: a medical-surgical center opened in 1999 and a maternity center opened in 2003. As with its other projects, it has established a network of First Aid Posts and Primary Health Clinics connected to the center.

==== Eritrea ====
Emergency began work in Eritrea in 2019, providing support for the cardiac clinics at the Orotta Medical Surgical National Referral Hospital in Asmara. The hospital is also linked to Emergency's Salam Centre for Cardiac Surgery through a regional cardiac surgery referral program.

==== Gaza ====
In September 2025, Life Support was dispatched to support the Global Sumud Flotilla trying to break the blockade of the Gaza Strip and deliver humanitarian aid to Gaza, which is undergoing famine during the ongoing genocide.

==== Italy ====
The organization has been working with migrants, refugees and disadvantaged individuals in Italy since 2005. Through a network of outpatient clinics (located in Palermo, Polistena, Marghera, Castel Volturno, Naples), it has provided over 210,000 consultations. It also runs Mobile Clinics across Italy, which are intended to provide healthcare in places were access to public facilities is limited, including farming areas, refugee and migrant reception centers, and Roma camps; they are housed in converted buses, minivans and lorries. In 2020, during the COVID-19 crisis, Emergency assisted in building a field hospital in Bergamo.

The organization also plays a strong advocacy role in Italy, and its lobbying is considered to have influenced the Italian Parliament's decision to ban the production, sale, and use of landmines in 1997.

==== Iraq ====
The organization has been established in Iraq since 1995, primarily treating victims of landmines from the 1981-1988 conflict. The Sulaymaniyah Rehabilitation and Social Reintegration Center provides physiotherapy, the fitting of prostheses for amputees, and vocational training courses.

In 2017, it reestablished operations at the surgical center in Erbil that it had handed over to local authorities in 2005. The decision was taken due to the hospital's proximity to the Battle for Mosul. Throughout the year, the organization provided free medical assistance to casualties of war . As the acute phase of fighting ended, the hospital was handed back to be run by local authorities, having performed 1,749 surgical operations during its intervention, mainly for bullet and shell injuries.

==== Search and Rescue in the Mediterranean ====
In December 2022, EMERGENCY began maritime search and rescue (SAR) services in the Central Mediterranean with its ship Life Support. The ship operates between the Italian island of Lampedusa and the Libyan coast, providing aid and emergency medical assistance to migrants attempting to cross in unseaworthy vessels.

EMERGENCY previously provided medical aid, cultural mediation and post-rescue assistance onboard Migrant Offshore Aid Station’s (MOAS) ship Topaz Responder in 2016, and onboard Proactiva Open Arms’ ship Open Arms between 2019 and 2022.

==== Sierra Leone ====
EMERGENCY Hospital in Sierra Leone ⇒ playlist

Emergency runs a Surgical Center in Goderich, near the capital Freetown.

During the Ebola crisis, staff were trained in containing the spread of the disease at their established surgical and pediatric center in Goderich. With the virus spreading rapidly, they opened an intensive care unit for Ebola patients - the only facility of its kind in Sierra Leone. As hospitals were overwhelmed, their center was the only surgical and pediatric center to remain open in the entire country.

==== Sudan ====
The Salam Center for Cardiac Surgery in Khartoum serves over 50,000 patients every year. The 63-bed facility was designed by Studio Tamassociati and won the Aga Khan Award for Architecture in 2013. The Salam Center was the first facility in the African Network of Medical Excellence, a collaborative initiative with African health ministries to develop a better, more sustainable health system that addresses regional needs.

The organization also runs a network of Pediatric Centers across the country: in Mayo, a suburb that evolved from a refugee camp on the outskirts of Khartoum, since December 2005, in Port Sudan since 2011, and in Nyala. Activities in Nyala were suspended in 2011 after the kidnapping of an EMERGENCY worker in Darfur, but resumed in 2020.

==== Uganda ====
The Entebbe Children's Surgical Hospital is the second facility in the African Network of Medical Excellence, offering free pediatric surgery to children across the region. When the 72-bed hospital was opened in 2021, it tripled the number of pediatric surgical beds available in Uganda. The hospital was designed pro bono by architect Renzo Piano.

Map of countries where EMERGENCY operates and has completed programs

=== Completed Projects ===
Emergency has completed projects in Afghanistan, Algeria, Angola, Cambodia, Central African Republic, Eritrea, Iraq, Italy, Libya, Nepal, Nicaragua, Palestine, Rwanda, Serbia, Sierra Leone, Sri Lanka, and Sudan. Completed projects often result in the transition of Emergency-run hospitals to local health authorities.

== Awards ==
In 2013, Open Heart, a film directed by Kief Davidson about eight Rwandan children who left their families to be operated on at the Salam Center, was nominated for the Academy Award for Best Documentary Short Film.

On 30 November 2015, Gino Strada and EMERGENCY received the Right Livelihood Award in Stockholm, Sweden, "for his great humanity and his ability to offer medical and surgical assistance of excellence to the victims of war and injustice, continuing to denounce the causes of war without fear."

The organization was awarded the Gold Medal for Public Health by the Italian government in 2016.

In February 2017, Gino Strada and EMERGENCY were awarded the Sunhak Peace Prize in Seoul, South Korea, for treating Ebola in Sierra Leone.

In 2020, the organization won the European Economic and Social Committee's Civil Solidarity Prize for its international response to the COVID-19 pandemic, and specifically for its field hospital in Bergamo, Italy.

== Books ==
- Gino Strada, Green Parrots: A War Surgeon's Diary, Charta, 2005, ISBN 978-88-8158-524-3
- Howard Zinn, Just War, Charta, 2006, ISBN 978-88-8158-572-4

=== In Italian ===
- Gino Strada, Pappagalli verdi - Cronache di un chirurgo di guerra, Feltrinelli, 1999, ISBN 88-07-17032-9
- Gino Strada, Buskashì - Viaggio dentro la guerra, Feltrinelli, 2002, ISBN 88-07-17069-8
- Giulietto Chiesa, Vauro, Afghanistan anno zero, Guerini e Associati, 2001, ISBN 88-8335-242-4
- Emergency, Medici di guerra - Inviati di pace, Guerini e Associati, 2002, ISBN 88-8335-319-6
- Vauro, Principessa di Baghdad, Guerini e Associati, 2003, ISBN 88-8335-432-X
