= With Open Gates =

Anti-immigration video

With Open Gates: The Forced Collective Suicide of European Nations
- Release date: 2015
- Running time: 19:31
- Language: English

With Open Gates: The Forced Collective Suicide of European Nations, is a 2015 anti-immigration video released during the European migrant crisis. The video lasts for 19 and a half minutes.

The video focuses on the threat posed by mass migration. It was condemned by Vice Media as anti-migrant and counterfactual.

== History ==
According to the Anti-Defamation League, the video originated on 8chan, in a subforum entitled "Politically Incorrect", where it was created by a group of users led by the user "Gex." It was featured on websites including Breitbart News. The number of viewings surged in the wake of the November 2015 Paris attacks.

The video was composed of footage from news reports and interviews, many of which Vice Media claimed as "out of context" for either showing migrant and refugee violence prior to 2015 or happening in a different European country than claimed. It had over 2 million views when it was removed by YouTube following allegations of copyright infringement; it quickly reappeared on other social media sites.

Marjorie Taylor Greene, who was elected to the United States House of Representatives in 2020 shared the video on Facebook in 2018.

== Reception ==
Vice Media described the video as "a racist propaganda film." The Anti-Defamation League called it "a virulently anti-refugee propaganda video". Steve Deace wrote a column about the video in The Washington Times, saying that the video shows what could be at stake in America, “if we continue to let our own cultural heritage bleed out.”.
