= Kosovo refugees in Albania =

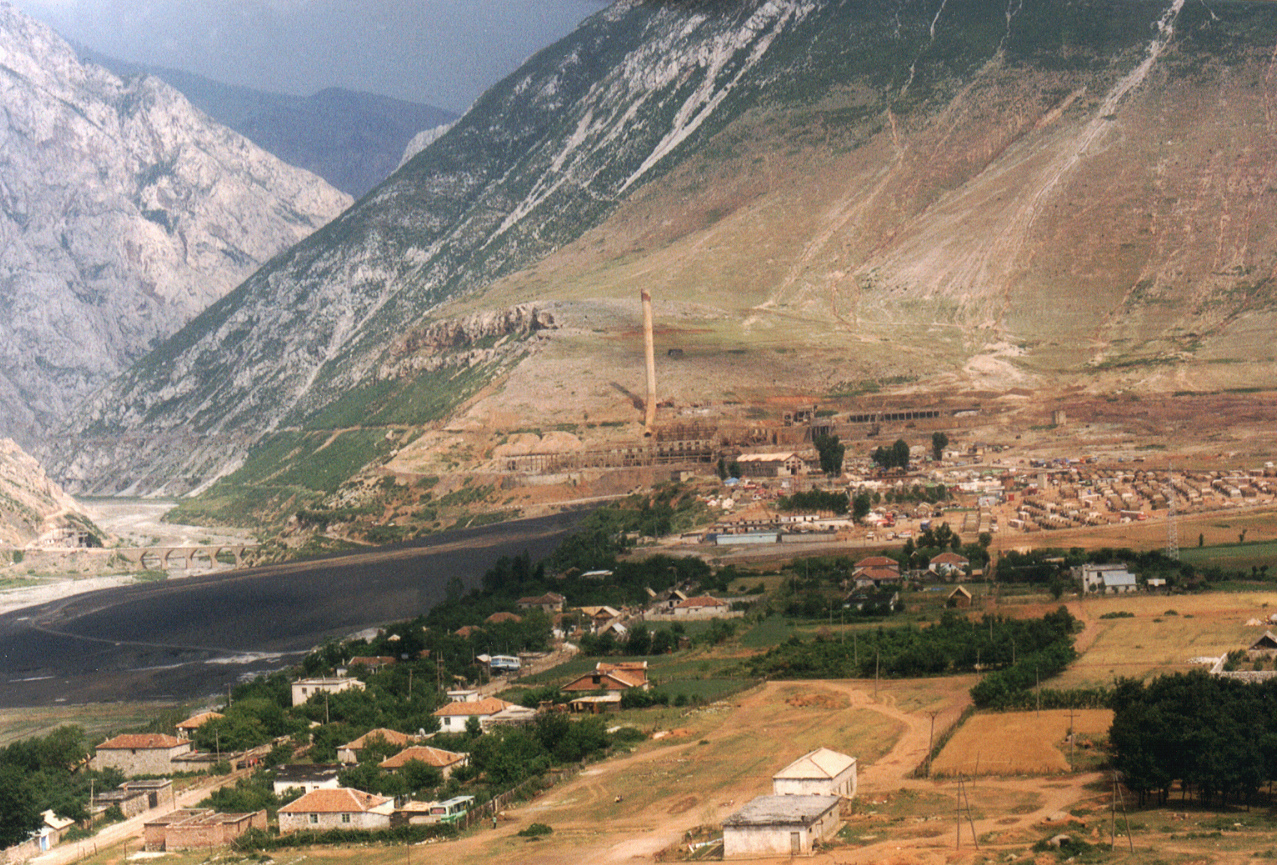
A Kosovo refugee camp in Kukës, Albania

Kosovo refugees in Albania refers to the mostly ethnic Albanians of Kosovo (at the time part of the Federal Republic of Yugoslavia) fleeing the Kosovo War into neighboring Albania in 1999. This crisis was exceptional at the time, as a movement of population this big in such a short period of time except in 1995 when Serbian people were expelled from Croatia with support of the NATO. In addition to the ones going to Albania, a large number of Kosovo refugees fled to the Republic of Macedonia. Almost all of the remaining 500,000 to 600,000 individuals in Kosovo were also displaced in the region itself, without leaving it.

== March to June 1999 ==
In March 1999, the NATO started a military air strike in Kosovo, in the name of a "Humanitarian War". This led to many Albanians fleeing from Kosovo to neighboring countries, mainly from March to June 1999.

Albania opened its borders from the beginning of the crisis in order to let refugees come. People were arriving directly at the border located at the north east of the country, or were transferred from Macedonia. Albania was not prepared for so many people to come and asked for international help in order to cover refugees basic needs. To coordinate the operations, the Albanian government created the Emergency Management Group days after the NATO military air strike began. This group coordinated actions from main structures such as the UNHCR and many other organizations such as NGOs. The situation was nevertheless delicate during the first days because UNHCR and NGOs did not predict that the NATO bombings would last for several months and lead to such a movement of population. Equipment was at first lacking, but many international structures and NGOs raised funds and/or gave practical help to Albania. Several European countries stated that it was in the interests of the refugees to stay in the region and gave financial help. Germany, for example, gave money to build camps in Albania for refugees transferred from Macedonia. On top of the refugees placed in camps, the Albanian population welcomed many of them in their homes, sharing space and food.

Almost 435,000 refugees had to leave Kosovo for Albania, according to the UNHCR. Most of them arrived directly in Albania and some of them were transferred from Macedonia. At the height of the Kosovo War, refugees were crossing the border into Albania at the rate of 4,000 people per hour. Afterward, the UNHCR stated that up to 25% of the population of Kosovo had fled.

On June the 11th, 1999, the air campaign from the NATO stopped. The day before, a military technical agreement was signed by both parties and ended the armed conflict. Afterward, the UNHCR report written about the refugee crisis stated that it was well managed, regarding the circumstances.

== Return of refugees ==
In the peace treaty signed by NATO and the Federal Republic of Yugoslavia, it was asked that refugees could go back to their homes. Most of the refugees were indeed able to go back to Kosovo during the same year, after the armed conflict ended.

== Controversy ==
NATO blamed the Federal Republic of Yugoslavia and its leader Slobodan Milošević for the refugee crisis. Because of the instability in the region from 1998 already, the NATO did not separate the mass influx of refugee from 1998 to the end of the conflict in its statistics. According to several researchers, however, the mass influx started just after the NATO bombing of Yugoslavia.

== See also ==
- Kosovo war
- Humanitarian war
- Operation Shining Hope
- Demographics of Kosovo
