= Nigerian refugees =

Displaced people from Nigeria

Nigerian refugees are persons originating from the country of Nigeria, but seeking refuge outside the borders of their native country. Nigeria has a refugee crisis which has extended for almost a decade, mainly due to the insurgency in Northern Nigeria by the Boko Haram.

The number of internally displaced that have arisen from insecurity and insurgency in Northern Nigeria is perhaps one of the highest in the world.

== Nigerian refugees in Niger ==
Refugees from Nigeria fleeing violence from Boko Haram are living with local populations in the Diffa Region, Niger. As of June 11, 2014, "The International Rescue Committee (IRC) estimates that as many as 1,000 refugees a week are crossing the border into Niger's Diffa region. Four out of five are women and girls. The IRC estimates that if the violence continues in northern Nigeria, up to 100,000 refugees could be living in Diffa by the end of the year."

== Nigerian refugees in Cameroon ==
As of October 30, 2013, IRIN reports:

"There are a large number of Nigerian refugees in Cameroon's Far North Region, The United Nations High Commission for Refugees on Tuesday. February 12, 2019 said it would relocate Nigerian refugees from Kousseri, a city in Far North Region, to a camp, where urgent shelter and sanitation construction were already underway. it was added that once screening was completed, the relocation would bring the total number of Nigerian refugees in Cameroon to nearly 66,000, of whom 41,571 refugees had already been verified by UNHCR.

Speaking at a briefing in Geneva, Adrian Edwards for the UNHCR said the relocation convoys from the border to Kousseri will begin Wednesday.the UNHCR would organize daily transfers of 2,000 refugees to the camp. At Minawao, the UNHCR would provide basic relief aid, like blankets, kitchen sets and soap. The camp is currently hosting 32,621 Nigerian refugees.

Many of the Nigerians who have fled into Cameroon prefer to stay with friends and family near the border areas.

The refugee population fleeing from Boko Haram are scattered in very inaccessible localities in the north of Cameroon, and many who refuse to be registered and stay in camps are still at the mercy of the [Boko Haram] sect, and are seen as threat to local security," said UNHCR's Hamon.

Authorities fear the lack of registration could ease Boko Haram infiltration into the country.
