= Integration of immigrants in Germany =

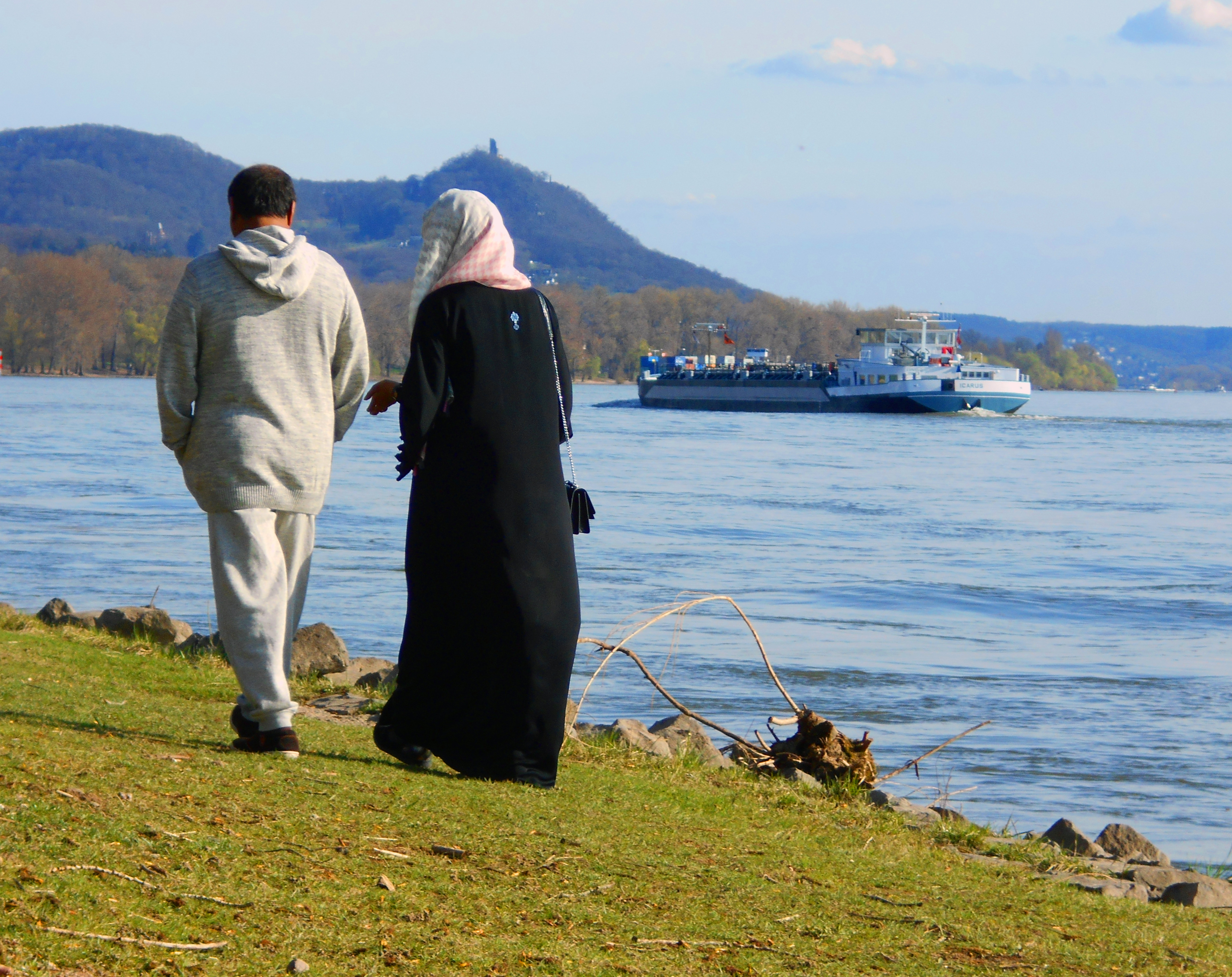
Integrating immigrants in Germany is the responsibility of the government and civil society.

The integration of immigrants in Germany describes the historical development, political frameworks and social dynamics through which migrants and refugees have been incorporated into German society since 1945.

== History ==
In the theory of social Desintegration, integration is understood as a successful relationship between freedom and commitment, with three dimensions being considered: the social structural, institutional and personal dimensions. If integration fails and disintegration occurs, this leads to a loss of social cohesion and is ultimately the cause of violence.

=== Integration of refugees and forcibly resettled Germans from Eastern Europe ===
The more than 8 million displaced persons who were taken in by West Germany and almost four million by East Germany between the end of the war and 1950 were not counted as immigrants. In East Germany, these displaced persons – also known as "resettlers" – made up almost a quarter of the population, and they initially experienced exclusion and decline, especially in rural areas. Until the construction of the Berlin Wall in 1961, there were also more than 4.3 million resettlers (Übersiedler) from the GDR to the Federal Republic of Germany and almost 400,000 resettlers from the Federal Republic of Germany to the GDR. The GDR refugees integrated into the Federal Republic of Germany without developing an identity as a group, and they had German citizenship from the outset.

Since 1950, approximately 4.5 million (late) resettlers have been accepted into Germany.

=== Repatriates and late repatriates since the eastern treaties ===
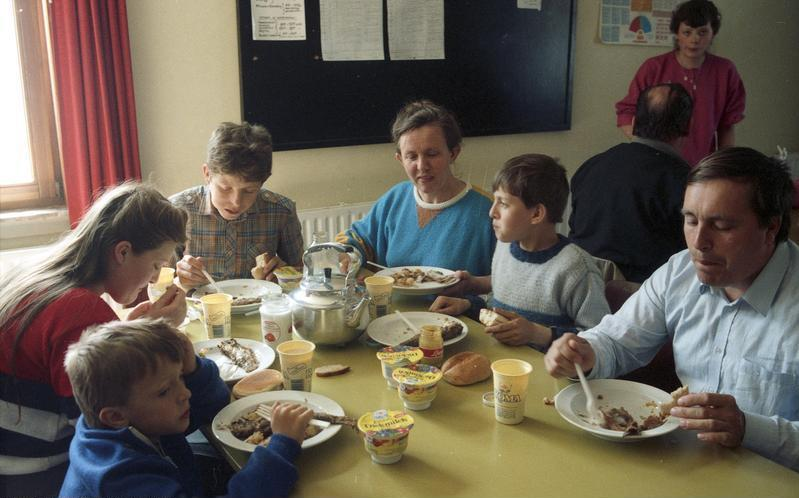
Repatriates eating at the Friedland camp in 1988

Although ethnic German resettlers and late resettlers had and in some cases still have similar integration problems as foreign migrants and their descendants, and although migration researcher Jannis Panagiotidis argues for analyzing the development of Germans from Russia who immigrated to Germany after 1991 under the category of "post-Soviet migration", many of those affected and their associations resist being considered "migrants". This population group often has quick access to German citizenship and sometimes already has a good knowledge of German upon immigration.

In the theory of social Desintegration, integration is understood as a successful relationship between freedom and commitment, with three dimensions being considered: the social structural, institutional and personal dimensions. If integration fails and disintegration occurs, this leads to a loss of social cohesion and is ultimately the cause of violence.

=== Recruitment policy under the assumption of return ===
The largest immigrant groups and their descendants in Germany include the population of Turkish origin. Among the foreign population, Turks, Poles and Italians are the most strongly represented (2015 with around 1.5 million, 0.7 million and 0.6 million respectively).

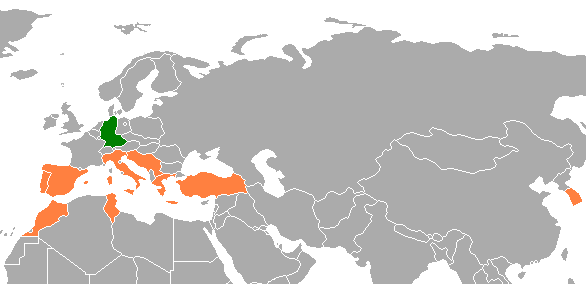
Recruitment Agreement of the Federal Republic of Germany 1955 to 1968, orange coloured the countries of origin

Between 1955 and 1973, approximately 14 million guest workers came to West Germany as a result of recruitment agreements with Italy, Spain, Greece, Turkey, Morocco, South Korea, Portugal, Tunisia and Yugoslavia; about 11 million returned home. In post-war West Germany, the integration of foreign immigrants was not part of the political discourse for a long time. This was based on the assumption that the guest workers (Gastarbeiter), who were mostly employed as unskilled laborers, would return to their homeland after a few years. Migration researcher Olaf Kleist emphasizes that when guest workers were recruited in the 1960s, "a certain amount of ghettoization was partly desired. There were special school classes for the children of guest workers. Integration was to be prevented because it was always assumed that the guest workers were only staying in Germany temporarily." And in the East Germany, the contract workers (Vertragsarbeiter) lived clearly separated from the citizens.

However, the assumption that most guest workers would return turned out to be wrong over time. Since about 2005, integration policy in Germany has gained in importance.

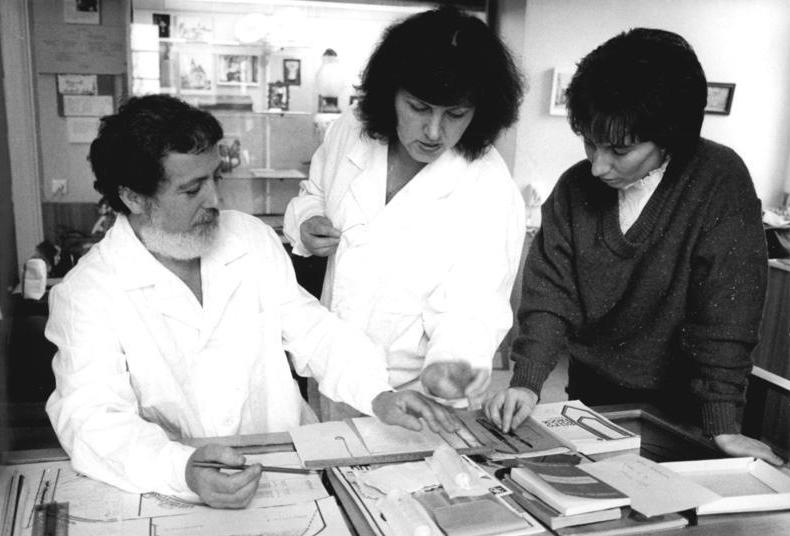
Polish guest workers in Germany in 1989

The guest workers from Turkey were recruited for unskilled and semi-skilled jobs and, in both the first and second generations, have below-average German language skills, an extremely strong limitation of friendship networks to their own ethnic group and the worst integration into the labour market. From Iran, on the other hand, there was an exodus of elites with a high level of education and relatively low levels of religiosity. Most of them are well integrated. The social background of the parents is therefore crucial for the success of integration.

=== Integration policy since around 2005 ===
The principles of state integration measures are laid down in §§ 43 to 45 of the Residence Act (AufenthG), which came into force on 1 January 2005, supplemented by the Integrationskursverordnung (IntV). Further regulations apply to certain foreigners – for example, EU citizens, asylum seekers, displaced persons, members of the armed forces.

In the Immigration Act, which contained the first version of the Residence Act, the term "integration" was used for the first time in migration policy legislation in 2005. It was in this context that the modern integration courses were introduced.

Previously, the justification for the revision of the Aliens Act had addressed the role of the right of expulsion in relation to integration. At the time, the legislator had declared that the right of expulsion creates clarity about the possible reasons for termination of residence and thus enables foreigners to "structure their stay in the federal territory in such a way that they do not provide any reason for termination of residence." The right of expulsion is therefore "a — reasonable — basis for integration," because "anyone who stays within the limits of the reasons for expulsion is protected from expulsion".

In 2005, in addition to the previously usual distinction between foreigners and Germans, the microcensus for the first time classified people with German citizenship to investigate the migration of immigrants and the next generation: Since then, the microcensus has differentiated people with and without a migration background based on their migration status and the possible migration of their parents after 1949. According to the Federal Institute for Population Research (BiB), the background to this distinction was "the question of the need for integration and the actual integration of people who have German citizenship but nevertheless have a migration background (for example, resettlers, naturalised citizens, children of foreign parents)". With its definition, the BiB contradicted the claim in 2005 that resettlers and late resettlers are not migrants and should therefore not be included in studies on the topic of migration.

In the coalition agreement of 2005, integration policy was seen as a cross-cutting task . At the beginning of the 16th Bundestag, the commissioner for migration, refugees and integration was therefore assigned to the Federal Chancellery and upgraded to minister of state. A first integration summit was held in 2006 and it was agreed to draw up a National Integration Plan. The Integration Ministers' Conference was subsequently held in 2007.

As a cross-sectional task, integration policy affects a wide range of policy areas and is closely linked to migration policy and social policy in particular. While integration policy continues to focus on the local level, a ministry in each federal state is now responsible for the area of integration. At the federal level and in almost every federal state, the office of a foreigners' or integration commissioner has also been created.

The German Islam Conference was opened by the Federal Minister of the Interior in September 2006 as an institutionalized dialogue process between the German state and Muslims in Germany.

In a 2012 publication by the Federal Agency for Civic Education, the state of integration was described as "not satisfactory despite the National Integration Plan of 2007", as significant differences between people with and without a migration background persist. Even well-qualified foreign workers are more affected by unemployment and have a lower labour force participation rate than the corresponding groups without a migration background. It is emphasized that integration policy in Germany is now similar to that of other Western European countries, but that Germany took this step very late.

Today, the Federal Ministry of the Interior (BMI) describes the "integration of immigrants living permanently and legally in Germany" as "one of the most important domestic policy tasks", both in terms of granting rights and observing obligations. Previously, the BMI had emphasised the guideline "promoting and demanding", in the tradition of activating social policy, as practiced in Germany especially since Agenda 2010.

=== Further developments in the refugee crisis from 2015 ===
The 2015–2016 German refugee crisis presented new challenges regarding the integration of newcomers for German refugee policy. The topic of integration became particularly explosive in German politics in 2015 in the wake of the 2015–2016 German migrant crisis.

With the entry into force of the Asylum Procedure Acceleration Act on 24 October 2015, integration courses were also opened to asylum seekers and tolerated persons, provided they have a good prospect of staying. However, refugee associations criticised the different access to integration courses depending on the prospect of staying: Pro Asyl expressed the view that this sorting in many cases ensures "that the integration of people who will stay permanently in Germany is unnecessarily delayed".

In December 2015, Social Democratic Party of Germany (SPD) politicians Manuela Schwesig, Andrea Nahles, Barbara Hendricks, Aydan Özoguz and Malu Dreyer presented a twelve-point plan for cohesion and integration in Germany. The integration concept was focused on education as the key to integration and participation and envisaged, among other things, 10,000 additional positions in the Federal Volunteers Service for refugees, 80,000 additional childcare places, 20,000 additional educators and an all-day school programme. In the interests of labour market integration, refugees were to take part in language courses and measures to enter the labour market at the same time, qualifications were to be obtained more quickly and with less bureaucracy and 100,000 additional jobs were to be created in the context of refugee aid. Funding for housing construction for 350,000 new apartments was also included. In response to a request from the Greens, the Federal Government described this integration concept in January 2016 as a "political position paper" on which the Federal Government did not have to comment. Member of the German Bundestag Katja Dörner subsequently assessed the presentation of this plan as a "pure show event".

At the end of 2015, the Federal Voluntary Service with reference to refugees (Section 18 BFDG) was introduced and the BFD was provided with 10,000 additional positions limited to three years. Since 2016, some federal states have been offering legal education classes for refugees in addition to the integration course.

In May 2016, the federal government passed a draft integration law. After amendments, the integration law was passed in July 2016, which, among other things, provides for a residency requirement for recognized refugees, the requirement of integration services for a settlement permit, a partial waiver of the priority test, an expansion of orientation courses and a toleration for the duration of the training and possibly a further two years. It largely came into force on 6 August 2016.

In the course of the 2015–2016 German migrant crisis onwards, there was increased social debate about Islam and Islamism, for example with reference to Sharia law in contemporary Western states and the role of women.

In March 2016, Germany's Federal Center for Health Education, under the assumption that at least some of the migrants would need sex education, launched a website aimed at the newcomers. Teaching everything from masturbation, first-time sex, family planning, sexually transmitted diseases, to respect for members of the LGBTQ community, the site drew some criticism because of the graphic depictions and descriptions of sexual acts. While some disagreed with the use of tax payer money going to this project, some for economic reasons and others for assuming that the migrants need sex education, supporters argued that providing knowledge on German sexual norms was an important part in the integration process.

There have been repeated attempts to define more precisely what integration means and what its prerequisites are. For example, Federal Minister of the Interior Thomas de Maizière stated that to integrate, refugees must not only recognise the Basic law, but also become involved in German society. For this, a commitment to non-violent coexistence is just as important as understanding the Holocaust.

There are reports from refugee camps that religious minorities such as Yazidis and Christians being harassed by Muslim refugees and insulted as infidels.

Stefan Luft also points to norms of masculinity that legitimize violence, a high propensity for violence and a high level of violence, which can be a major challenge for teachers and police officers, even to the point of being overwhelming, and which they cannot be left alone to deal with.

A structural problem is that decisions about which refugees have the right to stay take a relatively long time. During this period, it is not possible (even by state bodies) to prevent those who are capable of integration and willing to integrate from making progress in integrating into German society. Such progress continues even when a person who is actually required to leave the country cannot actually be deported, primarily because his nationality cannot be proven or because the country of which he is a citizen does not want to accept him. If German state bodies finally "succeed" in deporting the person concerned, he is often torn out of a network of relationships in which he is needed (also from the German perspective). Critics see this process as a "refusal of integration from above".

With regard to refugee policy, Pro Asyl criticized plans for anchor centres in 2018, as the isolation in such centres would hinder the integration of those who would remain in Germany.

=== Asylum policy ===
Asylum seekers are initially subject to severe restrictions with regard to their integration: a ban on working, compulsory central accommodation in refugee shelters and a residency requirement. Although such regulations can negatively affect the integration system, they are designed to reduce incentives ("pull factors") for applying for asylum in Germany.

Die Regelungen zum Arbeitsmarktzugang von Flüchtlingen änderten sich im Laufe der Zeit erheblich. Die Genfer Flüchtlingskonvention gibt hierzu auch keine Vorgaben. Asylberechtigten wurde ab 1971 systematisch eine Arbeitserlaubnis erteilt, wobei von der Vorrangprüfung abgesehen wurde. Nach dem Anwerbestopp von 1973 galt für Geflüchtete ein Arbeitsverbot, das 1975 teilweise gelockert wurde, um die Kommunen finanziell zu entlasten. Ab Anfang der 1980er Jahre erteilte die Bundesanstalt für Arbeit nunmehr Asylbewerbern während des ersten Jahres des Asylverfahrens keine Arbeitserlaubnisse mehr; ab 1982 galt dies für zwei Jahre. Baden-Württemberg (ab 1982) und Bayern (ab 1985) erteilten Asylbewerbern für die Dauer ihres Asylverfahrens ein generelles Arbeitsverbot. 1985/86 wurden Arbeitsverbote für die Dauer von fünf Jahren eingeführt. Im Zuge der Flüchtlingspolitik nach der Wiedervereinigung wurde dieses Verbot im Laufe des Jahres 1991 schrittweise auf ein Jahr reduziert, dann aufgehoben, 1992 wiedereingeführt und auf drei Monate festgesetzt und 1993 weiter verschärft. Under the Blüm Decree, which was later declared unconstitutional in case law and subsequently withdrawn, asylum seekers were not granted any work permits from 1997 to the end of 2000 on the grounds of high unemployment; later, access to work was made possible again on the basis of a priority check and a condition check. Access to the labour market was re-regulated in 2005 with the Immigration Act.

An explicit, cut-off date-dependent 'right of residence regulation' for de facto integrated foreigners was introduced by the decision of the Conference of Interior Ministers on 17 November 2006 and was specified and supplemented on 28 August 2007 by statutory regulations linked to the cut-off date of 1 July 2007 (Sections 104a and 104b of the Residence Act). They were later supplemented by dynamic regulations, i.e. are not tied to a fixed date: On 1 January 2009 (Section 18a of the Residence Act) and additionally on 1 July 2011 (Section 25a of the Residence Act). On 1 August 2015 (Section 25b of the Residence Act ), introduced regulations for a residence permit for well-integrated tolerated persons and their children.

=== Effects of the COVID-19 pandemic ===
The COVID-19 pandemic in Germany created additional hurdles to integration. Language and integration courses were generally cancelled or carried out online in 2020. Due to a lack of parallel childcare options or a lack of technical equipment or knowledge, many people dropped out. Opportunities for refugees in collective accommodation and locals to meet were no longer available – such as contact with volunteers and sports. Children of migrants sometimes received little help with homeschooling or virtual school attendance. Educational providers reported that refugees had difficulties integrating into the job or training market, especially since companies were reluctant to offer internships. The Munich-based Ifo Institute for Economic Research reported that from the beginning of the pandemic, unemployment among refugees and migrants was higher than among Germans, excluding systemically important areas such as nursing, in which they were overrepresented.

=== Integration of refugees from Ukraine ===
From February 2022, many war refugees from Ukraine came to other European countries, including Germany as a result of the Russian invasion. The vast majority of refugees are women and children. After initially only receiving benefits under the Asylum Seekers Benefits Act, they have had access to regular social benefits arranged through the Jobcenter since 1 June 2022.

The Institute for Employment Research (IAB) assessed the formal educational level of the Ukrainian population as "relatively high". In this context, the IAB stressed the need for sufficient high-quality and flexible childcare options so that women can attend language and integration courses and then be integrated into the labour market. According to media reports, Ukrainian highly qualified people often take on jobs for which they are overqualified due to various hurdles - including language skills requirements and delays in the recognition of training.

== Definition: "Immigrants" or "migrants" ==
In its study on the status of the integration of immigrants in Germany, published in 2024, the Organisation for Economic Co-operation and Development (OECD) reduces the group of what it calls "immigrants" or "migrants" to those born abroad without taking into account their nationality before immigration. This is because nationality can change, but place of birth cannot. The OECD systematically separates those born in Germany from immigrants. They generally have different problems than migrants in the narrower sense of the word. Of those born in Germany, people are only taken into account if both parents were born abroad. When analysing the integration process, immigrants and those born in Germany are analysed separately.

The study avoids using the terms "migration background" and "immigration history". This is based upon marriage rules. For example, grandchildren of immigrants are not included in the category of those born in Germany even if their mother, who was born abroad, married a man born in Germany through marriage migration (see above: "both born abroad").

== Actors ==
In Germany, according to Section 10, Paragraph 3, Sentence 2 of the Nationality Act, the minimum period of eight years of legal residence required to be eligible for naturalization can be reduced to six years if special integration efforts can be demonstrated. This includes, in particular, proof of German language skills that exceed "adequate knowledge" (according to Section 10, Paragraph 1, Sentence 1, Number 6 of the Nationality Act). The existence of special integration efforts is defined in more detail in the Federal Ministry of the Interior's Provisional Application Guidelines for the Nationality Act, Number 10.3.1: "The prerequisite is the existence of special integration efforts. This includes German language skills, which must exceed the requirement of adequate language skills and should therefore be at level B2 GER or higher. Other special integration efforts could include, for example, long-term voluntary work with a non-profit organization or association. When making the discretionary decision, an overall assessment must be made in each individual case, in which several achievements together can justify privileged naturalisation".

In general, a lack of willingness to integrate is cited as a reason for imposing sanctions on those who refuse to integrate.

Since 2009, it has been possible to obtain a residence permit for well-integrated tolerated persons, with extensions in 2011 and 2015. This does not mean that all well-integrated people have the right to stay. In Germany, this issue mainly comes into the media when, for example, neighbours and friends, companies and colleagues, or even teachers and classmates turn to the public to oppose the threatened deportation of a well-integrated, previously tolerated person or family. The removal of students from class has been met with particular criticism. The resistance of students attracted media interest when a teenager in Duisburg and a young adult in Nuremberg were taken out of school for deportation in May 2017. Teachers explained that schools must be a safe space so that children feel safe and can learn without stress. Bavarian teachers protested in an open letter against being involved in deportations. The Education and Science Union (GEW) and the Police Union (GdP) also criticised deportations from schools on this occasion. The criticism of the deportation of 69 Afghans from Germany on 4 July 2018 also highlighted that some of those deported were well integrated. In this context, the refugee organisation Pro Asyl emphasised that when assessing individual cases by the hardship commission of the respective federal state, it is also taken into account whether the people concerned are well integrated and have a job.

The editor-in-chief of Die Welt, Ulf Poschardt, believes that Germany will only remain stable if integration succeeds. The immigrant has the task of making himself stand out in a positive way: "The idea of immigration must be to show everyone in the existing society. To be particularly hard-working, committed and successful in order to present the difference to the receiving societies less as a flaw than as a promise."

=== State and society ===
Different terms are used to describe the commitment of individuals, whether professional or voluntary, and the use of organizations in this area. Depending on the context, for example, we speak of integration work, integration projects and programs, migration social work or refugee work, and at the political level of integration policy. The actions of state bodies and municipalities must comply with the framework of the above-mentioned supranational legal norms and the Basic Law for the Federal Republic of Germany.

Facilitating the integration of refugees is also enshrined as a state obligation in Article 34 of Directive 2011/95/EU (Qualification Directive).

=== Mutual agreements ===
Some states have integration agreements which, on the one hand, provide for obligations, for example with regard to the acquisition of language skills or participation in integration courses, and, in return, are linked to better conditions with regard to financial benefits or residence rights. Integration agreements have existed in Austria since 2003 and in Switzerland since 2007.

In Germany, agreements have been proposed at federal or state level. Certain persons are required to attend an integration course, the fulfilment of which is linked to benefits under the Social Code II, for example. In addition, voluntary integration agreements are used in migration counselling (Migrationsberatungsstelle) for adult immigrants.

== Modalities of integration ==
There are three phases to integration, as the chancellor of Germany Angela Merkel made clear in her speech at the 10th German Integration Summit: the phases from arrival, immigration to living together. Overall, according to the chancellor, it is about initial integration, integration, access to education, training, the job market, sport, culture, media, participation and anti-discrimination measures.

=== Linguistic integration ===
The integration of immigrants includes learning the local language, both written and spoken. In some cases language support programmes are also available.

The importance of language support is highlighted, for example, in a draft integration law in Germany, which specifies minimum requirements:

"For successful integration, the acquisition of the German language is an essential prerequisite. This also applies to people who will only live in Germany for a short period of time. Because these people should also integrate for this short period of time and learn and follow the social rules. To do this, they need knowledge of the German language. The sooner integration begins, the more successful it can be. Long periods of inactivity carry the risk that people's high level of motivation will be lost without being used. Temporary integration is preferable to a period without integration. Only in the case of people from safe countries of origin does it seem justified to initially forego support with the aim of integration due to the individually low probability of staying until their status is clarified."

In order to integrate migrants and refugees who wish to stay (or are likely to stay) in the host country permanently, it is necessary to impart to them language skills that not only enable all of them to participate successfully in everyday conversations, but also enable those with the necessary skills to obtain further education and vocational training. This corresponds to at least competence level B2 of the Common European Framework of Reference for Languages. It is assumed that the acquisition of German as a second language, especially if it begins late, can take five to seven years to achieve native-like mastery, even with school support. The lack of mastery of the language of education in the host country, i.e. the language of instruction in schools, represents a major obstacle to the full integration of migrants and refugees.

In some German states, the Low German language is taught as an elective subject in schools. Previous experience suggests that teaching this language could also benefit the children of immigrants, as they would realize that students of German descent have to learn Low German just like they do. Bilingual children benefit from their already acquired linguistic reflection skills. Alternatively, children of immigrants can receive remedial lessons in German or lessons in their native language.

Linguists emphasise that mastery of one's own mother tongue is crucial for learning a new language faster and better. They therefore consider mother tongue instruction in schools to be indispensable. It is also important to keep open the possibility for students to return to their country of origin and work there. Foreigners should "under no circumstances speak broken German with their children, but stick to their mother tongue". Another example of mother tongue instruction in schools is the teaching of the mother tongue that is common today in Sweden. In North Rhine-Westphalia, children with an immigrant background can take lessons in the most widely spoken languages of origin. A total of ten German federal states offer state-funded and organised Arabic lessons in their schools. Turkish lessons taught as supplementary mother tongue education was previously also available in Bavaria.

In Germany, language instruction is part of the integration course. The West Mecklenburg employment agency reported that of the 1,497 participants registered for German courses offered to refugees in 2015/2016, only 716 attended them to the end. The magazine "Fakt" of the Mitteldeutscher Rundfunk concludes that this rate is also likely to apply to other employment agencies and that a large part of the 300 million euros invested in German courses for refugees in 2016 was therefore "wasted". The Federal Audit Office complained in March 2017 that nationwide "by about halfway through the course, only 43 percent of the registered course participants were still present."

=== Integration through education ===
Education is considered to be "the key to participation in economic, cultural and social life". Intercultural Education deals with the design of the integration of immigrants in the education system.

According to research by the Council for Migration in 2016, the school qualifications of students with a migration background (i.e. immigrants or their descendants) in Germany are becoming more similar to those of students without a migration background. However, students with a migration background still finish school with lower qualifications on average: the rate of high school graduates is 17% (23% for students without a migration background). The proportion of school dropouts is 12% (5% for students without a migration background).

See also: Kiron Open Higher Education, Platform job & Educational disadvantage in Germany

==== School integration ====
The Mercator Institute for Language Support and German as a Second Language (University of Cologne) describes five models according to which immigrant children and young people can be integrated into school: In the (1.) submerged model, students attend regular classes according to their ability and also receive targeted and differentiated support. In the (2.) integrative model, students are enrolled in a regular class and only receive additional language support as integration assistance. In the (3.) partially integrated model, regular class participation only takes place in certain subjects, while other subjects are taught in special classes. In the (4.) parallel model, all lessons take place in separate classes, usually for one school year. Except in the (5.) parallel model with school leaving certificate, in which segregated schooling continues until the end of compulsory schooling. The latter model has the worst effects on integration.

In the Federal Republic of Germany, the implementation of Intercultural Education into the education system from the 1960s onwards was referred to as foreign education . It was characterised by a deficit orientation that problematised the cultures of origin of the pupils and the allegedly traditionalistic influence of the parents' homes. Educational measures were intended to have a compensatory effect on the one hand, and to encourage a willingness to return on the other. In 1980, the sociologist Peter Kühne saw school integration as being hampered by a number of disruptive socialisation conditions. He cited discrepancies between the transmission of values at home and at school and the corresponding educational measures, problems with communication and acceptance among each other and the corresponding formation of ghettos in leisure time, but also the excessive demands placed on young people by parallel cultural lessons and the often lacking special skills of the teachers providing the training.

From the end of the 1980s, this culturizing attitude of foreign education was increasingly criticized and the Federal Republic of Germany changed to intercultural education. The focus now is on an education that values the cultures of all actors involved and no longer sees immigrant students as a "special problem" but focuses on the entire school system. The pedagogical concepts go hand in hand with a gradual development of the teachers' skills and act situationally and with an open mind.

As early as 1980, Kühne pointed out that socially integrative effects do not arise "by themselves" simply by being together, but must also be addressed, reflected upon and practiced in a curricular manner and with competent teaching methods to be able to reduce mutual feelings of social alienation and superiority. He saw the didactic goal as helping young people to find their own identity and a compatible, value-based set of social norms in the often confusing conflict between cultures.

The psychologists Anita Rudolf and Siegbert Warwitz see the greatest opportunities for school integration in a consistent implementation of the interdisciplinary project-based learning. This enables the necessary thorough thematic and didactic processing of the problem area. They support this idea with six theses in which they point out, for example, the complexity of the project and the corresponding need for an interdisciplinary approach, the inclusion of appropriate specialist skills and their cooperation, or the introduction of complementary teaching methods and the activation of different learning potentials in the sense of multidimensional learning.

In a similar way, the pedagogue Erich Renner also envisages the design of school operations with an integration mandate: In his opinion, the educational institution school should become a "school of social and cultural encounters" in the sense of the socio-politically important task of integration.

=== Integration into the labour market ===
Integration into the labour market is considered a crucial aspect of integration, as employment serves to secure a livelihood. However, the legal requirements depending on the residence status must be taken into account. For example, certain visas that allow entry for employment purposes require a minimum income (such as the EU Blue Card).

In Germany in 2015, around 75 percent of EU citizens and immigrants from third countries with a residence permit for gainful employment were employed. Among asylum seekers and refugees, the proportion was around 55 percent (as of mid-2015), and in the short term it was considerably lower.

In their 2016 book The New Germans, political scientists and married couple Herfried Münkler and Marina Münkler highlighted the rapid integration of newcomers into the labour market and, more generally, the avoidance of passivity as the most important demands of German integration policy.

Since access to the labour market and the pursuit of a job that matches one's qualifications often fail due to unclear responsibilities for the recognition of foreign professional qualifications, the law to improve the assessment and recognition of professional qualifications acquired abroad (so-called "Professional Recognition Act") was passed in 2012. The IQ network was founded in 2015 to implement this law.

==== Professional integration of refugees ====
Access to vocational training for foreigners depends on their residence status, as explained in more detail below.

In Germany, a distinction is made between asylum seekers, refugees and tolerated persons. All recognized refugees are allowed to work; asylum seekers and tolerated persons must first wait a period of three months and obtain the approval of the employment agency before they can accept a job. However, measures within the scope of vocational training or, for example, internships are exempt from this test. Asylum seekers with a residence permit are subject to a temporary absolute ban on working under Section 61 Paragraph 2 of the Asylum Act; after the work ban has expired, the priority test may have to be observed. Tolerated persons can also be allowed to take up employment for the duration of their toleration.

According to an OECD study from 2016, over 70 percent of highly qualified refugees in Germany were not employed in a job that corresponds to their qualifications, more than in most European countries (as of 2016). This rate has not decreased by 2021. Refugees seeking work are not necessarily included in the "unemployed" category. In January 2017, only 40% of refugees registered as job seekers with the Federal Employment Agency (BA) were registered as unemployed. Although anyone who is looking for work as an employee and reports this to the BA is classified as "job seeker," anyone who is not immediately available to the labour market – for example, because they are taking part in a language and integration course, an internship, further training or a labour market policy measure such as a job opportunity or are subject to an employment ban – is not considered unemployed.

Efforts to integrate young refugees, especially during the period of highest immigration during the 2015-2016 German refugee crisis, often led to disappointments on the part of both the refugees and the social actors who were trying to integrate them. 11% of the refugees had no school education at all, and the young people's expectations of being able to quickly enter the workforce or complete training sometimes turned out to be an illusion.

A nationwide employer initiative is specifically aimed at the group of "refugees with good prospects of staying". They (along with "old applicants", the long-term unemployed and employees in a workshop for disabled people) are offered the opportunity to acquire partial qualifications in various modules related to recognised training occupations on the basis of Section 69 of the Vocational Training Act . However, many training courses require a relatively high level of language skills.

In the 2010s, many refugees in Germany took up employment or training in the construction industry. The industry is seen as having potential for the labour market integration of refugees, especially in the long term.

Circles close to employers have stated that the educational level (not just the level of language skills) of refugees has long been "glossed over" and that placing most of them in the primary labour market requires a lot of work. Further problems from the employers' perspective arise when refugees who have been hired are deported, thereby losing manpower in the short term.

=== Integration through participation in public life ===
One factor in integration is participation in public life, including public transport. While kindergartens in Germany, Austria and Switzerland already introduce children to the rules of traffic, newcomers from different countries sometimes lack the basic prerequisites for safe participation in public transport. For several years, volunteers who run youth traffic schools have been trying to close this gap by offering special courses in which interested people of all ages can be trained to become safe pedestrians and cyclists under expert supervision.

The Federal Ministry for Family Affairs assigns migrant self-organizations a "bridging function" in integration.

==== Integration through sport ====
Sports clubs are said to play a particularly positive role in promoting integration, as it is almost a given that intercultural social contacts develop and are strengthened there. Sport is the most popular leisure activity in Germany for people with a migration background – just as it is for people without a migration background. However, sports clubs do not automatically have an integrative effect. For example, institutional barriers such as inertia, a commitment to tradition and the desire for homogeneity of sports clubs hinder their fundamental openness. People with a migration background are less likely to be members of sports clubs in Germany than people without a migration background. People with a migration background are less likely to be members of sports clubs in Germany than people without a migration background.

Through the Integration through Sport programme, the German Olympic Sports Confederation is committed to integration into society as well as integration within the structures of organised sport.

=== Identification ===
As President of the German Bundestag, Wolfgang Thierse repeatedly stressed that an immigrant was not required to deny his cultural origins. He must, however, accept the basic values of the constitution and democratic rules. At the same time, he stressed the importance of learning the national language.

In his review of the book by Emilia Smechowski, We Nerd Migrants, Harry Nutt emphasizes the importance of the "experience of social mobility, which has always been the greatest driver of social integration in modern societies".

== Further aspects of integration ==
=== Diversity in companies and institutions ===
There are also funding programs designed to promote integration into the labour market. For example, the German federal government supports the integration of people with a migration background into the labour market with the funding program Integration through Qualification.

In the context of diversity, equity, and inclusion in the workplace, human rights organisations on the one hand and companies on the other sometimes mention the desire to take more measures to ensure equal treatment of migrants in the world of work, to raise awareness of discrimination and to promote the acceptance of diversity.

=== Support for families ===
In working with socially disadvantaged people, offers that involve home visits (so-called walking structures ) are considered to be particularly low-threshold forms of assistance. In connection with assistance for families with a migration background and children of preschool age, the following offers are among others:

- PAT – Learning with Parents
- Stadtteilmutter
- Opstapje (target group: 0–3 years)
- HIPPY (target group: 3–6 years)
- Backpack KiTa (target group: 4–6 years)

In contrast, we speak of "come-to" structures when the services are available outside of one's own home – be it in schools or daycare centres, or in other social institutions.

=== Closing the "socialization gap" of older migrants ===
As the rest of the western world, Germany is affected by population ageing particularly in regard to the 2030s.The proportion of people aged 65 and over in the migrant population in Germany is expected to increase from 8.4 percent (in 2007) to 15.1 percent by 2032, and the absolute number of older people with a migrant background is expected to rise from approximately 1.4 million (in 2007) to approximately 3.6 million (in 2032).

A fundamental problem that people who leave working life face and enter retirement is that they may experience a "socialization gap". Wolfgang Clemens understands "socialization" as a process "in which people are encouraged to act, challenged and thus engaged by social structures and programs". For pensioners, social integration no longer takes place through gainful employment, but is limited to socialization through family, social networks, leisure time and consumption. Unlike for all other age groups, society does not provide typical regulations for (old) age (such as attending kindergarten and school, vocational training and practice, and looking after one's own children); old age must be shaped individually.

After losing their employment, integration deficits become more acute for many people with a migration background, especially since opportunities for participation through consumption are greatly reduced when the average income in old age is low. According to a study from 2013, 41.5 percent of people over 65 without German citizenship in Germany are at risk of poverty (among their peers with German citizenship, the figure is 13.3 percent).

The AAMEE (Active ageing of Migrant Elders across Europe) project of the Ministry of Health, Emancipation, Care and Ageing of the State of North Rhine-Westphalia dealt with the situation of ageing people with a migrant background from 2007 to 2009. In the same year, the German Federal Ministry of Family Affairs, Senior Citizens, Women and Youth summarised the situation of older people with a migrant background in Germany as follows:

- Regarding the de-professionalisation of old age, older migrants give up their employment earlier than German nationals;
- A feminisation of age is not true, since men are more frequently represented than women in the 40–60 age group and those aged 60 and over; this male surplus results from the recruitment policy of the 1960s/70s.
- This has consequences for the loneliness of old age;
- Older migrants live in single-person households more often than German nationals of the same age.
- Extreme old age among migrants is still rare, but its proportion is increasing; in addition, the poorer initial health conditions and the lower level of economic compensation resources lead to a higher and earlier need for assistance and care.

According to the ministry, "a revival of ethnicity in old age" would be counterproductive with regard to the integration of migrants.

As the non-profit-organisation Terre des Femmes points out, many girls living in Germany are also at risk of genital mutilation. The procedure is usually carried out by women from their home country, and rarely or not at all in Germany, but rather during a holiday at home or in other European cities such as Paris or Amsterdam. Currently (as of mid-2017), 58,000 women in Germany are affected and a further 13,000 are at risk, significantly more than a year earlier, when 48,000 were affected and 9,000 were at risk. In Germany, female genital mutilation has been a criminal offence since 2013 and became a foreign criminal offence since 2015, but still remains an issue.

Male circumcision, on the other hand, is not illegal in Germany if it is carried out by a doctor under general anesthesia with the consent of the parents (§ 1631d paragraph 1 BGB); if the newborn is under 6 months old, the person carrying out the procedure can also be a person with special training designated by a religious community (§ 1631d paragraph 2 BGB). The question of circumcision of sons also arises in some mixed-cultural families and may touch on questions of religious and cultural identity.

The death of a 34-year-old woman on 13 July 2021 in Berlin, whose two brothers were suspected of murder, caused a nationwide stir. The woman from Afghanistan was reportedly a victim of an honor killing. In this context, psychologist Ahmad Mansour pointed out that ideas about sexuality in the countries of origin of many refugees are patriarchal in nature. In response to the great differences to the Western host society, particularly with regard to the equality of women and their sexual self-determination, there is sometimes a rejection of Western society and even contempt for society and its values. Mansour explained that existing problems in the integration of migrants are hardly noticed in society. In particular, the oppression of women by patriarchal structures is ignored. He emphasizes the necessary protection of women by society. Terre des Femmes called for integration gaps to be closed and preventive measures to be taken against violence in the name of honor. "Honor killings" are the "tip of the iceberg" of the often long-term oppression and forced marriage of girls and women, which is not recorded in figures in Germany. The curtailment of women's freedoms is about "the absolute control of female sexuality."

== Studies ==
=== Cross-country studies ===
The OECD studies mentioned above can also be classified as "cross-country" because similar studies on the situation in other OECD member states were published at about the same time and because the study on Germany draws on the results of these studies in the form of country comparisons.

The context of the OECD 2024 study includes the widespread prejudice that "foreigners only come to Germany to exploit the welfare state." According to the Leipzig Authoritarianism Study (2018), 35% of Germans partially or fully agreed with this thesis; 35% also partially or fully rejected the thesis in 2018, and 30% were undecided. Local debates have repeatedly arisen, especially when it comes to the construction of refugee accommodation.

The study presents several arguments against the theme of "immigration into the social systems" and the "lack of usefulness of immigrants for the German economy":

- The employment rate of the immigrant population in Germany is currently 70% – this is more than in most other comparable EU countries and the highest value achieved to date. The immigration of 11 million people of working age in Germany has mitigated the worsening shortage of skilled workers. (p. 9)
- The recognition of high-quality foreign educational qualifications was made considerably easier between 2014 and 2024 (p. 12) .
- Almost two-thirds of immigrants of working age who have lived in Germany for at least five years say they have advanced German language skills. Although this proportion is somewhat lower than in the rest of the EU, Germany has shown particularly significant improvements in the language skills of immigrants. Germany's "competitive disadvantage" compared to long-standing colonial powers must be taken into account, which is evident in the fact that only relatively few immigrants in Germany had a native-speaker command of German when they arrived. (p. 12 f.) After five years of residence, more than four-fifths of immigrants who originally had an intermediate level of German speak fluent German (p. 13) More than half of all immigrants of working age have attended a language course or are currently taking one. Only in Luxembourg and the Nordic countries is this proportion higher. (p. 14)

The OECD summarizes the positive aspects of developments in Germany with the words: "Germany has invested significantly in integration over the past two decades, and these efforts appear to have paid off. The integration results in Germany are in many respects favourable by international comparison. The differences in living conditions are often smaller than in other countries, and the employment rates of immigrants are high by international comparison." (p. 34)

The OECD study also lists "vulnerable" groups that require special support: (p. 16)

- Immigrant women with small children,
- Female refugees in general and
- Immigrants with a low level of education.

The OECD also considers it necessary to "address the challenges in the area of public perception" (p. 29).

=== Integration monitoring ===
Since 2011, a cross-state evaluation of the status of the integration of people with a migration background in the federal states has been presented every two years in Germany within the framework of the Integration Ministers' Conference.

Various integration reports produced in Germany differ considerably in the number of indicators, dimensions or areas of investigation and data sources; the microcensus is one of the sources used for this purpose. In connection with data collection on the state of integration, a risk of an 'ethnicisation' of the integration debate is highlighted on the one hand, but on the other hand there is also a need for more meaningful surveys. For example, Susanne Worbs, a research associate at the Federal Office for Migration and Refugees, cites the following distinctions used in integration monitoring:

- Persons with and without a migration background (occasionally: persons with a migration background and the total population).
- Foreign and German nationals. A special case of this is the comparison of naturalized citizens with foreigners of the same origin group.
- First generation (those born abroad) and second generation (those born in Germany); alternatively a differentiation according to age groups.
- Men and women.
- Selected countries or regions of origin. This differentiation is the most controversial, among other things because it is feared that it will encourage an "ethnicisation" of the integration debate."

But Worbs also emphasizes:

"An integration monitoring loses a lot of its significance if it only refers to heterogeneous large groups such as 'foreigners' or 'people with a migration background'. To avoid this, it would be useful to make statements about at least the most important groups of origin and to combine this with the analysis of socio-demographic factors, social environment and/or social class affiliations"

== Economic aspects ==
Between 2005 and 2013, the Federal government of germany spent over 1.4 billion euros on the integration course system in Germany.

In 2016, the German government reported spending around 21.7 billion euros on dealing with the refugee crisis, including 2.1 billion euros on integration services. A study by the Centre for European Economic Research (ZEW) on behalf of the Heinrich Böll Foundation spoke of around 400 billion euros in additional costs or 20 billion euros in additional state revenue, depending on how successful their integration into the workforce is. However, according to economist Clemens Fuest, the total costs and revenues resulting from the refugee crisis "can hardly be reliably quantified".

In the 2017 federal budget, around 610 million euros were earmarked for the implementation of integration courses in accordance with the IntV.

== Research and teaching ==
Examples of research institutions on integration include the Berlin Institute for Empirical Integration and Migration Research (BIM) of the Humboldt University of Berlin, the interdisciplinary and interfaculty Institute for Migration Research and Intercultural Studies (IMIS) of the University of Osnabrück, the European Forum for Migration Studies (until 2019), the Frankfurt Institute for Empirical Migration and Integration Research of the Goethe University Frankfurt, and the Foundation Center for Turkish Studies and Integration Research of the state of North Rhine-Westphalia.

Some universities offer programs, degrees or certificates in this regard, such as the Master of Arts in International Migration and Intercultural Relations at the University of Osnabrück, the IB Diploma Programme program in Social Sciences: Migration and Integration at the Catholic University of Mainz, the Master of Science in Migration and Integration Management at the Department of Migration and Globalization at the Danube University Krems, and the International Certificates in the program "Integration and Diversity at the University of Göttingen" (InDiGU), and Integration, Interculturality and Diversity at the University of Passau.

More generally, migration and intercultural issues are addressed by the Master of Arts European Master in Migration and Intercultural Relations at the University of Osnabrück, the Master of Arts Intercultural Education, Migration and Multilingualism at the Karlsruhe University of Education and the Master of Arts "Migration and Diversity" at Kiel University.

== Criticism ==
=== Criticism of the concept of integration ===
The Association of Binational Families and Partnerships states that it is reluctant to use the term "integration" because society needs something different. It is more about "jointly ascertaining, balancing and negotiating where we stand together and where we want to go together", and thus about creating an "inclusive society". In this sense, the association advocates a broad definition of inclusion that goes beyond the group of disabled people: inclusion should not stop at one group in society.

Naika Foroutan notes that the term "integration" is being criticized because it is still generally understood to be primarily associated with an adjustment effort in the sense of assimilation of migrants and their descendants. According to Foroutan, "an attempt should be made to no longer refer the concept of integration only one-sidedly to migrants and their descendants, but to expand it to include society as a whole".

Kamuran Sezer, sociologist and initiator of the TASD-Studie, emphasizes that the German integration debate lacks a practical concept of integration. It is problematic to use only the criteria of knowledge of the German language, educational qualifications and employment.

=== Criticism of the integration concept ===
Paul Mecheril sees the public discourse on integration as a reaction to the fact that the fantasy of the national-ethno-cultural "we" has fallen into crisis. Talk of the "integration" of others focuses primarily on the in-group and out-group distinction.

When considering integration, the focus is more on "promoting and demanding" than on equal opportunities in terms of social, economic, political and cultural rights to participation. The call for adaptation to existing cultural paradigms is based on the "container model" with the idea of a homogeneous society in the immigration country. From a mainstreaming perspective, reference is made to the normality of transnational life – a life "across national borders".

In an interview with the Süddeutsche Zeitung in 2017, Wilhelm Heitmeyer explained that many people in Germany lack an essential element of integration: being noticed and recognized. He explained: "This applies not only to immigrants and refugees, but also to locals, especially to many people in the East. After reunification, the achievements of a whole life were devalued for many." The impression of losing control over one's own biography and politics leads "to an emptying of democracy and to disintegration." An "integration policy is also needed for all Germans who feel excluded".

In its report of November 2020, the Expert Commission on Integration Capacity called for a more open understanding of integration: the concept of integration must "break away from the one-sided focus on immigrants and their descendants and the integration of those seeking protection", to which it has been narrowed in recent years.

During the debate on the 2022 New Year's Eve riots in Berlin, Manuela Bojadžijev and Robin Celikates described the discourse on integration as a "split from above". They referred to structural obstacles in the right of residence, the education system and political participation. There is a lack of state efforts and obstacles are redefined in the social discourse as individual failure.

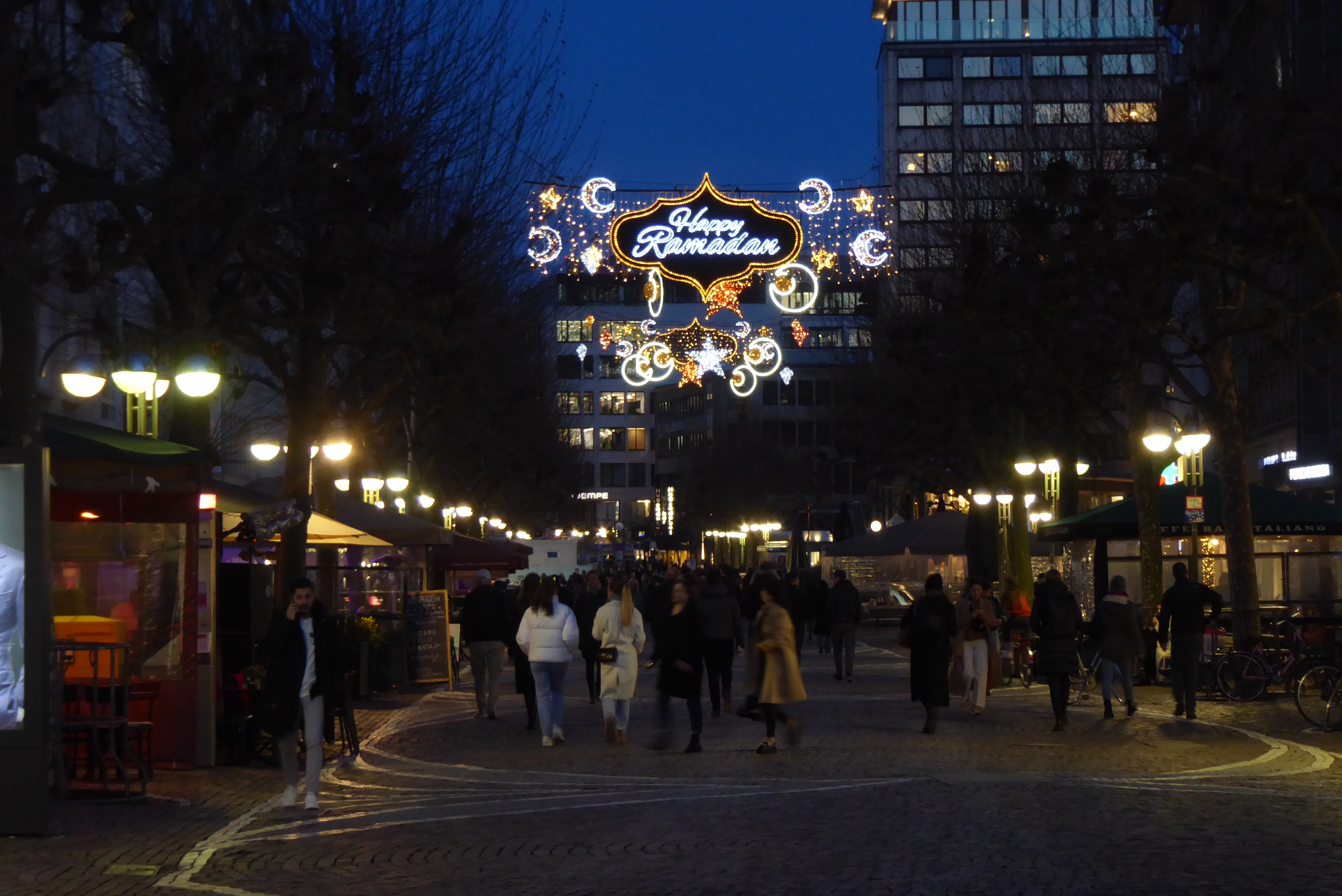
Lighting campaign by the city of Frankfurt to improve the integration of Muslims

In the course of the discussion about the desired level of diversity in German society, the international football match between Germany and Turkey in the sold-out Berlin Olympic Stadium on 18 November 2023, caused a media stir. Many observers had the impression that it was a home game for Turkey in the middle of Berlin with "a lot of passion, a lot of Turkish flags and a lot of police". The security forces recorded the isolated use of prohibited pyrotechnics both during the march of Turkish supporters and in the stadium. A police officer was punched in a confrontation. In addition, several Turkish supporters reportedly showed the salute of the right-wing "Grey Wolves". General Secretary of the Free Democratic Party (FDP) Bijan Djir-Sarai commented on the behaviour of people of Turkish origin in the stadium and its surroundings with the words: "It must hurt us all when people born or raised in Germany boo the German national team at an international match in Germany". In this context, the question of whether and to what extent immigrants in Germany must adopt a "German identity" or how much "deviant behaviour" they should be allowed is controversial. The behaviour of Turkish football fans in Berlin can also be classified as an expression of a "hybrid identity". According to this, the fans have both a German and a Turkish identity, which enables them to express their identity as Germans or as Turks depending on the situation.

== See also ==
- Immigration and crime in Germany
- Immigration to Germany
- Integrationskurs

== Literature ==
- Klaus J. Bade: Migration – Flucht – Integration: Kritische Politikbegleitung von der ‚Gastarbeiterfrage' bis zur ‚Flüchtlingskrise'. Erinnerungen und Beiträge, Von Loeper Literaturverlag, Karlsruhe, 2017, ISBN 978-3-86059-350-9. imis.uni-osnabrueck.de.
- Aladin El-Mafaalani: Das Integrationsparadox: Warum gelungene Integration zu mehr Konflikten führt. Kiepenheuer & Witsch, Köln 2018, ISBN 978-3-462-05164-3.
- Hartmut Esser: Integration und ethnische Schichtung. Arbeitspapiere Mannheimer Zentrum für Europäische Sozialforschung Nr. 40, 2001, ISSN 1437-8574.
- Hartmut Esser: Sprache und Integration. Die sozialen Bedingungen und Folgen des Spracherwerbs von Migranten, Campus, Frankfurt am Main 2006, ISBN 3-593-38197-4.
- Ursula Gross-Dinter, Florian Feuser, Carmen Ramos Méndez-Sahlender (Hrsg.): Zum Umgang mit Migration – Zwischen Empörungsmodus und Lösungsorientierung. transcript, Bielefeld 2017, ISBN 978-3-8376-3736-6.
- Friedrich Heckmann: Integration von Migranten. Einwanderung und neue Nationenbildung. Springer VS, Wiesbaden 2015, ISBN 978-3-658-06979-7.
- Werner Schiffauer, Anne Eilert, Marlene Rudloff (Hrsg.): So schaffen wir das – eine Zivilgesellschaft im Aufbruch. 90 wegweisende Projekte mit Geflüchteten. transcript, Bielefeld 2017, ISBN 978-3-8376-3829-5
