= Refusal to integrate =

Refusal to integrate (German: Integrationsverweigerung) is a political phrase in Germany. It primarily refers (in the variant "refusal to integrate from below") to the behaviour of immigrants who do not assimilate into the society of the host country to the extent that the user of the term expects.

Currently, the accusation of “refusal to integrate from above” is occasionally levelled against politicians and civil servants who, through restrictive regulations and measures, illegally make it more difficult for people already residing in the country to integrate.

Integration means "inclusion," "admission into a community of equals," and is thus always a bilateral process of rapprochement involving two sides, which can therefore fail on both sides, for example, due to mutual mistrust. What it euphemistically disguises is the hidden expectation that the foreigner should adapt, subordinate themselves, or even submit—a demand that cannot be expressed explicitly, however, since it would not be integration at all, but rather the creation of a power relationship based on permanent inequality.

== Refusal to integrate “from below” ==
If people with a migration background are classified as refusing to integrate, their adherence to the traditions and cultural assets of their country of origin is not interpreted as an exercise of constitutionally guaranteed fundamental rights, but rather as an expression of defiance or a lack of education.

In the German-speaking world, the term was used, among other things, in the discourse surrounding the integration courses introduced in 2004. It also played a role in the headscarf controversy.

=== History ===
In the 1750s, Benjamin Franklin accused the German immigrants to Pennsylvania of refusing to integrate because they stubbornly clung to their religious beliefs and customs, appeared culturally backward, and refused to attend English-language schools. He asked "Why should the Palatine (=Pfälzer) boors be suffer'd to swarm into our Settlements, and by herding together, establish their Language and Manners to the Exclusion of ours?". In this context, the Pennsylvania Committee for German Affairs demanded a ban on the German-language press and the use of German in schools and offices, and advocated for forced marriages with Anglo-Americans, a proposal which Franklin, however, rejected. Since the wave of immigration to the US from 1848 to 1855, Catholics (Southern Germans, Austrians, Irish, Mexicans) in particular were considered backward and refused to integrate. Later, criticism was directed against the Chinese immigrants' lack of willingness to integrate and the braids they wore as a symbol of their refusal to integrate. These braids were often forcibly cut off in San Francisco in the 1870s. Since the 1880s and 1890s, language tests have been increasingly demanded to enforce the integration of immigrants.

=== Criticism ===
The scientific side has objected to the original use of the term, arguing that a “basic insight of migration research” has not yet been accepted in Germany, “according to which migrants always form communities, use networks and also develop ‘parallel societies’, especially when they are rejected".

== Refusal to integrate “from above” ==
Recently, there has also been the accusation of a "refusal to integrate from above." Politicians from the Left and the Alliance 90/The Greens, in particular, use this term to criticize the regulations governing the reunification of relatives of those granted "subsidiary protection" in Germany. The constant concern about the fate of relatives left behind, they argue, massively hinders the integration of those granted protection.

In June 2018, Susi Möbbeck (SPD), Commissioner for Integration in Saxony-Anhalt, described the restrictive policy of the Federal Minister of the Interior as a "refusal to integrate".

Particularly controversial is the idea of a "change of lane," which would allow refugees willing to integrate but without secure residency rights in Germany to obtain residency rights as a sought-after skilled worker on the basis of an immigration law. In an online survey conducted by the "Süddeutsche Zeitung" in August 2018, 54 percent of voters welcomed such a "change of lane," while 37 percent rejected it. Opponents of a "change of lane" primarily argue that it would make Germany more attractive for illegal immigration. The deterrent effect of deporting those not granted asylum as an instrument for influencing the number of refugees cannot be dispensed with.

== See also ==
- Integration of immigrants
- Integrationskurs

== Literature ==
- Vera Kohlmeyer-Kaiser: Die »Zumutung« des Rechtsstaats. In: Blätter für deutsche und internationale Politik 6/2018. S. 92 f. (online)
