= Citizenship education (immigrants) =

Educating new citizens to prepare noncitizens to become citizens

Citizenship education for new citizens is education intended to prepare noncitizens to become legally and socially accepted as citizens, and is carried out by a variety of governmental and non-governmental organizations (NGO).

== Belgium ==
An integration program is organized in the Flemish Region of Belgium. The program is obliged in many cases and consists of an integration course made up of a basic level Dutch course and career orientation. It is also possible to enroll in the program in Brussels, without any obligation.

== Germany ==
In order to obtain German citizenship, it is compulsory for a citizen to pass the Integrationskurs - which teaches the basics of the German language and German culture and society, such as the German legal system, history, and culture, rights, and obligations in Germany, etc.

== Netherlands ==
In the Netherlands, the citizen education for new citizens is called "inburgeringsplicht". In many cases, the foreigner is obliged to learn very basic Dutch and basic knowledge about Dutch society while still abroad. The immigrant must pass an exam abroad before receiving a visa for temporary residence. All this depends on certain criteria (especially what country the foreigner comes from).

== United States ==
In the late 19th and early 20th centuries in the United States, government programs prepared immigrants to take citizenship exams or qualify for citizenship. Many corporations, most prominently Ford, offered similar programs to their employees and families of their employees. In addition, various charities also provided this service.

== United Kingdom ==
In the United Kingdom in 2002, David Blunkett introduced a series of proposals where immigrants would take a written "test" and participate in a ceremony before they could be granted British nationality. Before being given a passport, applicants read Life in the United Kingdom (a book providing information about the UK), prepare for and sit a 45-minute test on British society, history, and culture.

== See also ==
- Home Office
- Integration of immigrants
- Immigration and Nationality Directorate
- UK Visas and Immigration
