= Integrationskurs =

Integration course provided by Germany

The Integrationskurs is an integration course provided by Germany to help foreigners adjust to life in Germany. The Integrationskurs is intended to prepare noncitizens to become legally and socially accepted as citizens by learning the German language and the legal system, politics, culture, society, and history of Germany.

According to the legal definition in Section 43, Paragraph 2 of the Residence Act, the Integrationskurs supports the integration efforts of foreigners through an introductory offer for integration to successfully teach them the language, the legal system, the culture, and the history of Germany. Foreigners are to become so familiar with the living conditions in the federal territory that they can act independently in all matters of daily life without the help or mediation of third parties.

The Integrationskurs was introduced in 2005 as part of the Immigration Act. The ordinance determines the implementation of the Integrationskurs for foreigners and late resettlers (Integration Course Ordinance - IntV).

== Participation ==
The law differentiates between the right (Section 44 of the Residence Act) and the obligation (Section 44a of the Residence Act) to participate.

=== Eligible participants ===
The prerequisite for participation is permanent residence in Germany and a German residence permit.

Previously, asylum seekers and tolerated persons have not had access to the Integrationskurs according to Sections 43 et seq. of the Residence Act. This was changed by Article 3 No. 6 of the Asylum Procedure Acceleration Act of October 20, 2015, in Article 44 Paragraph 4 Clause 2 Residence Act new version in favor of persons with a residence permit (Article 5 Clause 2 IntV) to enable early language acquisition. However, registration is limited to three months after receipt of admission and depends on the places available on the course. Asylum seekers who come from a safe country of origin within Section 29a of the Asylum Act (Section 44 (4) sentence 3 of the Residence Act) are also excluded from participation.

EU citizens have no legal right to participate in the Integrationskurs but can be admitted to the Integrationskurs by the Federal Office for Migration and Refugees (BAMF) if places are available (Section 44 (3) sentence 1 of the Residence Act).

In 2012, 94,020 people started the Integrationskurs; in 2014, the number was 142,439. Over 180,000 new participants were expected for 2015, and around 306,000 new participants were forecast for 2016, taking into account the opening of the Integrationskurs for asylum seekers and those with a toleration status.

=== Obligation to participate ===
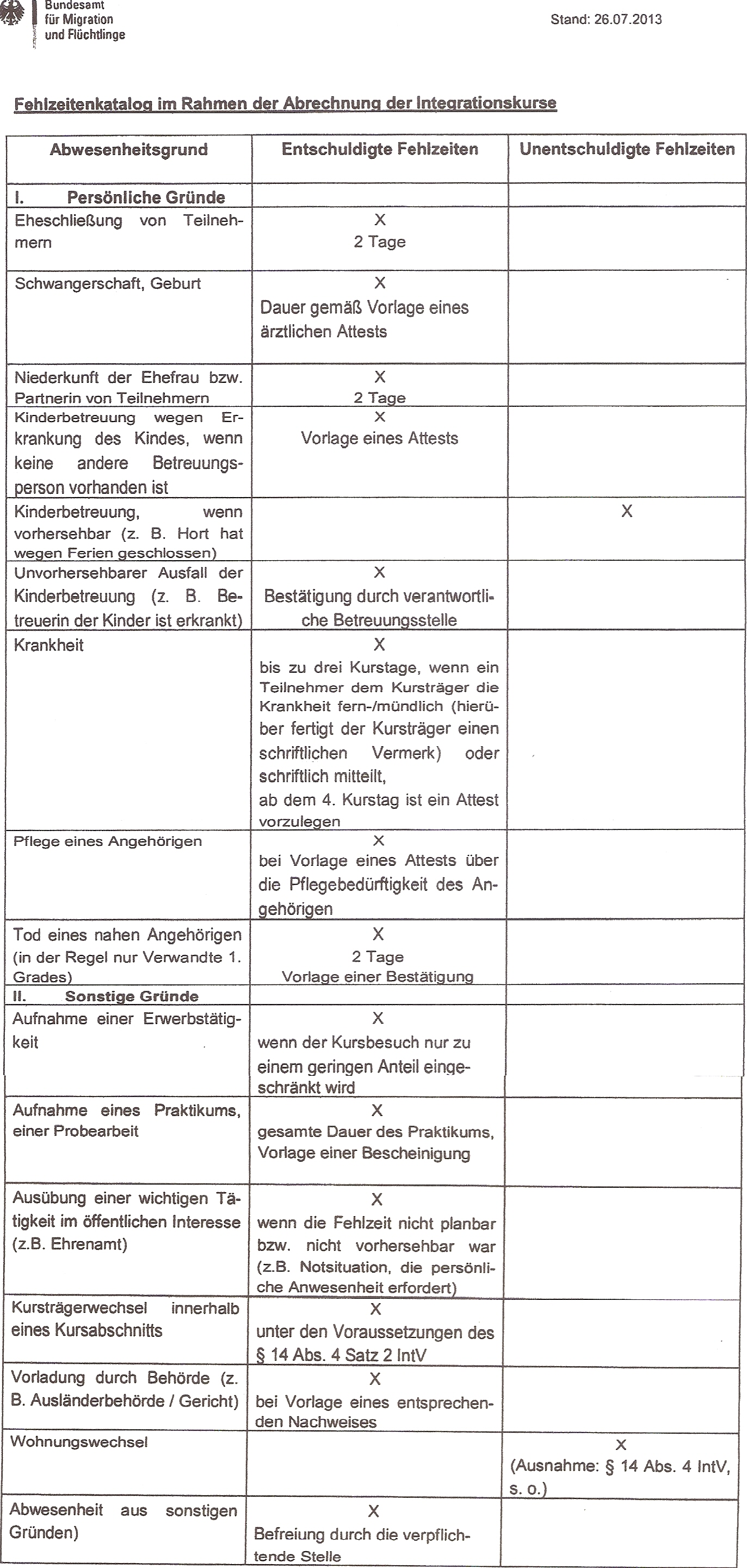
BAMF: List of absences by reason of absence and excused/unexcused absence, as of 26 July 2013

Immigration authorities can oblige people to take part in the Integrationskurs if they do not have sufficient German language skills and if they receive unemployment benefits or are to be specially integrated for another reason. For example, they have to take care of an underage child who lives in Germany. The course provider checks proper participation (§ 8 Para. 3 IntV) and can be enforced by administrative means if necessary (§ 44a Para. 3 Residence Act).

=== Legal consequences ===
If someone has proof of having completed the Integrationskurs, the minimum period for naturalization is reduced from eight to seven years (Section 10 (3) StAG). Successful completion also serves as proof of sufficient knowledge of the German language before a settlement permit is issued (Section 9 (2) sentence 1 no. 7, sentence 2 of the Residence Act) or an EU long-term residence permit (Section 9a (2) sentence 1 no. 3, sentence 2 of the Residence Act) and will be taken into account when extending a residence permit (Section 8 (3) of the Residence Act).

If participation in the Integrationskurs is provided for in an integration agreement under Book Two of the Social Code, a violation of the obligation to attend can also be sanctioned as a breach of duty with a reduction in benefits under Section 31 Paragraph 1 No. 1 SGB II (so-called refusal to integrate).

== Course content ==
The Integrationskurs consists of two parts: a language course and an orientation course. The lessons usually take place all day in groups with participants from different mother tongues. Successful participation in the Integrationskurs is certified with the "Integrationskurs Certificate". Some educational institutions also offer so-called arrival courses.

=== Language course ===
==== Duration and structure ====
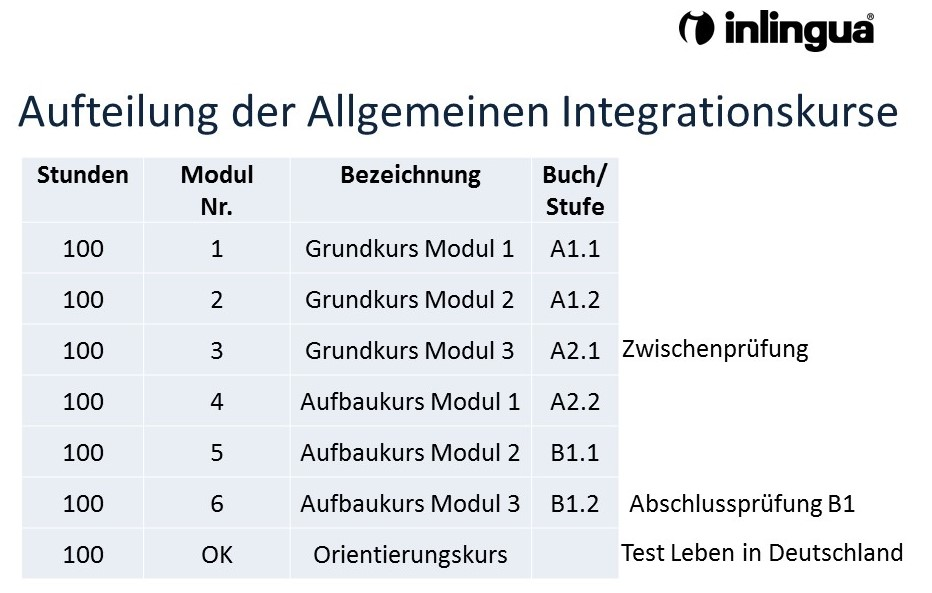
Division of the general integration courses from 1 October 2016

The language course comprises 600 hours of instruction, divided into a basic and an advanced language course. The aim is sufficient language skills to ensure the integration of migrants in terms of social participation and equal opportunities.

"Sufficient knowledge of the German language [...] is possessed by those who can find their way around independently in everyday life in their environment and, appropriate to their age and level of education, can hold a conversation and express themselves in writing (Level B1 of the Common European Framework of Reference for Languages)", § 3 paragraph 2 IntV.

If necessary, special courses can be offered aimed at different target groups.

The language course comprises up to 900 hours of instruction

- Integrationskurs for young adults under the age of 27 who are no longer of school age (youth Integrationskurs)
- Integrationskurs for those entitled to participate who cannot attend a general Integrationskurs for family or cultural reasons (parents or women's Integrationskurs)
- Integrationskurs with literacy
- Remedial course for special language pedagogical needs

The language course comprises only 400 hours of instruction in the intensive course.

To determine the individual, possibly also special needs, the participants take a test to classify their language level (placement test) before the start of the language course. The German test for immigrants (DTZ) completes the language course.

==== Content ====
The primary curriculum for the language course defines the course's learning objectives and content. It represents the framework for the conception of various course models and their design. The examination objectives of the DTZ are also based on the curriculum framework.

===== Development of the curriculum framework =====
In connection with the entry into force of the Immigration Act on January 1, 2005, in Germany, the BAMF commissioned the Goethe-Institut in the autumn of 2006 to develop a curriculum framework for the Integrationskurs. The framework was published in 2007.

To create the curriculum framework, the Goethe-Institut project group surveyed course participants and teachers as well as existing studies and works from other institutions (Institute for Migration Research and Intercultural Studies, German Adult Education Association) and the Goethe-Institut itself ("Curriculum for designing a six-month language course for Aussiedler", 1991). In addition, the Goethe-Institut commissioned scientists from the Ludwig-Maximilians-Universität München (LMU Munich) to "research and document the language needs of participants in the Integrationskurs by surveying institutions, course providers, and course participants (InDaZ)".

Scientific findings on the acquisition of German as a second language, knowledge of the different backgrounds (e.g., length of stay, educational socialization, and more), the importance of migration experience, and living conditions of those taking part in the Integrationskurs in Germany were also incorporated into the formulation of the curriculum framework.

Concerning the aspired ability of migrants to act, fundamental topics and specific areas in which they want or have to work linguistically should be determined.

===== Learning objectives =====
In the curriculum framework, a fundamental distinction is made between two types of learning objectives: communication according to fields of action and communication across fields of action.

The formulation is made using optional descriptions (example: "Can use straightforward means to talk about themselves and their situation in the country of origin, for example about the family, the job learned."). Individual or multiple learning objectives are described under so-called linguistic actions such as giving information, asking questions, reporting, and the like and are grouped by the corresponding skill (writing, reading, listening, speaking, conversation) and level (A1 to B1) according to the Common European Framework of Reference for Languages (CEFRL).

====== Communication in fields of action ======
Fields of action are divided into 12 areas:

- Agencies and public authorities
- Work
- Job search
- Initial and continuing education
- Banks and insurance companies
- Care and education of children
- Shopping
- Health
- Media usage
- Mobility (use of public transport, etc.)
- Instruction
- Housing

There are four sub-areas:

- To get a general idea
- Communicate with official bodies/institutions
- Communicate with superiors/employees of offices and authorities
- Communicate with peers, e.g. colleagues, other travellers, or neighbours

The learning objectives are specified by naming the priority activity (skill), the corresponding level, and the target group or groups (A, B, and C) for which the learning objective is relevant. There are three target groups:

- Group A has reasonable learning requirements and specific educational and career aspirations. On average, they are younger than the other groups and have lived in Germany for a shorter time.
- Group B focuses on family and children/school. They have a lower level of education or qualification than group A.
- Group C has a lower level of education or qualifications than group A. On average, they are the oldest group with the most extended stay in Germany. The group focuses on the world of work.

If necessary, it is also stated that specific regional knowledge (for example, "Knows that regulations in offices are binding, e.g., opening times.") is essential for implementing the learning objective.

====== Cross-field of action communication ======
Communication across all fields of action includes the basic communication needs of people in general:

- Realization of feelings, attitudes, and opinions
- Dealing with disagreements and conflicts
- Creation of social contacts

And in the special needs of migrants:

- Dealing with your language learning
- Dealing with the migration situation

In addition to the language act, the priority activity (skill), and the level, the description also includes the intention of the speaker (example: "Would like to exchange information about the reasons and goals of migration").

These communication areas are further subdivided. For example, the site "Dealing with the migration situation" consists of the following sub-areas:

- Report on migration experiences
- Dealing with intercultural encounters
- Presenting competencies
- Dealing with knowledge divergence and competence gaps
- Dealing with the individual language

====== Extra-linguistic learning objectives ======
The authors of the curriculum framework required a combination of linguistic, intercultural, and strategic skills for participation in social life. Therefore, before naming the learning objectives on a linguistic level, aspects of intercultural competence (example: "Is sensitized to culturally different communication practices in offices and authorities and can align one's actions accordingly.") and regional knowledge in the "Focus on Interculturality" and in the "Focus Country Studies".

Strategic competencies show up in dealing with knowledge deficits, competence gaps, and the use of learning techniques. Some of these are placed in the overarching communication areas of "dealing with the migration situation" (example: "dealing with knowledge divergence and gaps in skills") and "dealing with one's language learning" (example: "developing and expanding reading skills").

===== Practical implementation =====
For the most effective use, the target group (primarily test developers, textbook authors, and course planners) must observe the following:

- From the maximum possible learning goals mentioned, specific learning goals and content geared to the respective target group must be selected.
- Exams must not require competencies beyond the descriptions.
- Lexical and morpho-syntactic learning content can be derived from the learning objectives, but should not primarily determine the language courses.
- Progression in the language course should be based on action chains within the fields of action.

Teachers in the Integrationskurs use the curriculum framework to reflect on the teaching material and to understand specific course plans. In particular, the wording of the extra-linguistic learning goals (intercultural and strategic competence, knowledge of the country) allows these goals to be checked in the course. However, the curriculum framework should not be understood as a syllabus.

===== Intercultural aspects in the curriculum framework =====
(Inter)cultural aspects are dealt with in the communication areas "Dealing with the migration situation" (especially in the sub-item "Dealing with intercultural encounters") and "Realization of feelings, attitudes, and opinions", as well as in the "Focus on interculturality" or through the learning objective "Intercultural Competence" in the curriculum framework. The authors of the curriculum framework for the standard Integrationskurs name the relevance of cultural and intercultural aspects for the learners. However, these considerations are not based on a defined concept of culture.

In the needs analysis (InDaZ), under the heading "Aspects of interculturality", answers from respondents are listed that make it clear that intercultural aspects are essential in the course, especially in the final exam. A relatively narrow concept of culture seems to be adopted. The chapter "Language and culture of origin" mainly contains data on heterogeneity concerning the countries of origin of the course participants. The DTZ does not describe or discuss to what extent intercultural competence can be operationalized.

===== Qualifications for teaching in the language course =====
A university degree in German as a foreign or second language enables direct admission to teaching (§ 15 Paragraph 1 IntV).

The BAMF specifies alternative ways to qualify (§15 paragraph 2 IntV). Since January 1, 2020, the additional capability for teachers has included five compulsory modules and two compulsory elective modules. Other people can qualify through a course to acquire a relevant recognized DaF / DaZ (university) certificate or through a DaF / DaZ qualification program from certain other educational institutions.

=== Orientation course ===
The 100-hour orientation course follows the respective language course. Knowledge of German history, society, and culture is imparted to the course participants to make it easier for them to deal with their fellow citizens and authorities daily. The orientation course concludes with the "Living in Germany" test.

The orientation course initially comprised only 45 hours of instruction. It was increased to 60 hours in 2012 and to 100 hours in 2016 to enable an in-depth examination of the topics "Politics in a democracy", "History and responsibility", and "People and society".

The BAMF is developing the curriculum for the orientation course.

== Evaluation ==
Since January 1, 2006, the curricula, teaching and learning materials, and the content of the tests have been evaluated by an evaluation committee for quality control and further development of the concept of the Integrationskurs (§ 21 IntV).

In 2011, the Federal Office presented the first detailed evaluation of the Integrationskurs as a research report 11 and attempted to identify the Integrationskurs as "effective and sustainable".

In a detailed analysis of this evaluation, Günter Riecke contradicted this assessment in his study paper; the work concludes: The relative lack of success of the courses, given a pass rate of only 53% in 2012, is due to the lack of financial resources of the sponsors. This evaluation is an "eye-wash evaluation" written without relevantly qualified authors' involvement. The study contained numerous indications that the learning effect was weak up to 2012.

Statistics from the Federal Office for Migration show a success rate of around 57% for the highest possible certificate in German (level of competence B1) for the first half of 2012. According to the Goethe-Institut, this demonstrates basic knowledge of conversational German and is a minimum requirement for employment in the Federal Republic of Germany can be seen. Another 35% of the test participants achieved the language level A2 below. This rate was also conducted from 2016 to 2018, where 66.9% or 52.0% of the participants achieved level B1 and 25.5% or 32.9% achieved level A2.

== Financing ==
The institution conducting the Integrationskurs (course provider) receives a specific reimbursement of costs from the Federal Office for Migration and Refugees (BAMF) (§ 20 Para. 6 IntV). The participants had to contribute 50% of the applicable cost reimbursement rate to the course costs (§ 9 IntV), from July 1, 2016, to December 31, 2020, which was €1.95 per lesson. For registrations from January 1, 2021, the contribution is €2.20. Upon request, participants needing help will be exempted from the cost contribution. Successful participants can be refunded 50% of their cost contribution. Some federal states offer free courses for certain groups, such as refugees.

Course providers such as language schools and other educational institutions are only economically viable for group lessons when 20 participants are enrolled. The maximum number of participants is 25. The fee for teachers in the Integrationskurs is at least 35 euros for freelancers.

Participation and costs are regulated differently for specific groups by the Residence Act. A distinction is made between foreigners with a residence permit before or after 2005, German nationals, EU citizens, and late resettlers.

Between 2005 and 2013, the federal government spent over 1.4 billion euros on the system for the Integrationskurs. In the federal budget for 2017, 610.077 million euros were earmarked for implementing the Integrationskurs, according to IntV.

== Expansion plans ==
The coalition agreement for the 20th legislative period advocates the Integrationskurs for all people coming to Germany right from the start.

== See also ==
- Citizenship education (immigrants)
- Immigration to Germany
- Integration of immigrants in Germany
- German nationality law
- Federal Office for Migration and Refugees
