= Inequality in Germany =

Inequality in Germany encompasses disparities in income, wealth, social mobility and educational opportunity, economic outcomes by migration background and ethnicity, regional development between the former East and West, and pay between women and men. By international standards, income inequality is moderate: the Gini coefficient for equivalised disposable income was about 0.30 in 2025, close to the European Union average. Wealth is distributed far more unequally, with a net-wealth Gini of roughly 0.72 to 0.78 depending on the data source, among the highest in the euro area. Both income and wealth inequality rose over the 2000s and 2010s, and a marked gap persists between the territories of the former East Germany and West Germany more than three decades after reunification. Germany also has comparatively low intergenerational mobility and a wide gap in poverty risk between people with and without a migration background.

== History ==
Germany established the world's first national social insurance system under Chancellor Otto von Bismarck, introducing statutory health insurance in 1883, accident insurance in 1884 and old-age and disability insurance in 1889. Wealth was far more concentrated in the late nineteenth and early twentieth centuries than it is today; according to long-run estimates by Albers, Bartels and Schularick, the share of net wealth held by the wealthiest 1% fell sharply through the First World War, the 1923 hyperinflation and the Second World War before stabilising in the postwar decades.

The postwar social market economy combined rapid growth with a comparatively compressed distribution of income. Income inequality and poverty then rose markedly around the turn of the twenty-first century, during a period of labour-market deregulation that included the Hartz reforms of 2003–2005 and an expanding low-wage sector.

== Income inequality ==
Germany's Gini coefficient for equivalised disposable income, measured after taxes and social transfers, was 0.301 in 2025, up from about 0.26 in the mid-2000s; Eurostat publishes this figure on a 0-to-100 scale, where it appears as 30.1. The tax and transfer system lowers the Gini considerably relative to market incomes.

In 2024 the at-risk-of-poverty rate, defined as the share of people with incomes below 60% of the national median after transfers, was about 16%. Around 21% of the population was at risk of poverty or social exclusion in 2025. People living alone, single parents and the unemployed record well-above-average rates.

== Wealth inequality ==
Wealth is far more concentrated than income. The Deutsche Bundesbank's 2023 Panel on Household Finances put the Gini coefficient for net household wealth at 0.724, almost unchanged from 0.728 in 2021. Mean net wealth per household was about €324,800 in 2023, roughly three times the median, which reflects a strongly skewed distribution. Estimates from the Socio-Economic Panel (SOEP), which treat very high wealth differently, are higher still, with a Gini near 0.78 and the wealthiest 10% holding well over half of total net wealth.

Germany's comparatively high wealth inequality is often attributed to a low home-ownership rate and to the exclusion of statutory pension entitlements from standard wealth measures. A 2014 study by the German Institute for Economic Research (DIW) found Germany's wealth distribution to be the most unequal in the euro area at that time.

== Inequality by migration background ==
More than a quarter of Germany's population has a migration background, a status that official statistics define by a person's or their parents' birth without German citizenship rather than by ethnicity or race. People with a migration background face substantially higher economic risk: in 2024 their at-risk-of-poverty rate was around 28%, against about 16% for the population as a whole, and it was higher still for foreign nationals. The gap reflects lower average earnings, over-representation in low-wage work and, among children, a poverty risk roughly double that of peers without a migration background.

The make-up of this population has changed over time, from the guest-worker recruitment of 1955–1973, drawn largely from Turkey, Italy, Greece, Spain and Yugoslavia, to later arrivals of refugees, including during 2015–2016 and after Russia's 2022 invasion of Ukraine.

== Ethnic and racial discrimination ==
Because official statistics do not record ethnicity or race, inequality along these lines is documented mainly through field experiments and community surveys rather than administrative data. Correspondence studies have repeatedly found hiring discrimination: in one widely cited experiment, applicants with a German-sounding name were about 14% more likely to receive a callback than otherwise identical applicants with a Turkish-sounding name, and the gap reached roughly 24% at small firms. Later experiments covering Turkish, Arab, Russian and other names have found similar penalties despite equal qualifications.

The 2020 Afrozensus, a survey of nearly 6,000 Black, African and Afro-diasporic people conducted by community organisations with funding from the Federal Anti-Discrimination Agency, reported that anti-Black racism was widespread; respondents most often reported discrimination in the housing market, where a large majority said it occurred often or very often.

== Social mobility ==
Germany has comparatively low social mobility for a high-income country. The OECD estimated that it would take about six generations for the descendants of a family in the bottom income decile to reach the national average income, more than in the Nordic countries. Educational attainment remains strongly tied to family background, reinforced by early tracking into separate secondary-school types from around age ten. The DZHW's "educational funnel" finds that, of every 100 children from non-academic families, about 25 enter university, against about 78 of every 100 children from academic families; the disparity widens at each later stage, so that roughly one in 100 children of non-academic parents, but about ten in 100 children of academic parents, complete a doctorate.

== Regional inequality ==
Substantial east–west disparities have persisted since reunification. In the Bundesbank's 2021 survey, median net household wealth was €43,400 in eastern Germany against €127,900 in the west.

The German Democratic Republic had a centrally planned economy within the Eastern Bloc and was politically aligned with the Soviet Union. At reunification, the currency union converted eastern wages, pensions and much of household savings into Deutsche Mark at largely one-to-one rates; combined with rapid wage convergence and privatisation by the Treuhandanstalt, this left many eastern firms uncompetitive. The resulting deindustrialisation caused high unemployment and a lasting regional gap.

== Gender inequality ==
The unadjusted gender pay gap in Germany was 16% in 2024, down from 18% in 2023, the largest single-year fall since the series began in 2006, and it was unchanged at 16% in 2025. In 2024 women earned average gross hourly pay of €22.24, against €26.34 for men. The German figure is above the EU-27 average of about 11%.

The Federal Statistical Office estimates the adjusted gap, which compares employees with comparable jobs and qualifications, at about 6% in 2024. The unadjusted gap is far smaller in eastern Germany (5%) than in the west (17%), reflecting historically higher full-time employment among women in the former East. Occupational segregation persists, with men over-represented in manufacturing and women in health and social care, and women more likely to work part-time.
