= Residenzpflicht =

Residenzpflicht (German for mandatory residence) is a legal requirement affecting foreigners living in Germany, more specifically applicants for refugee status (Asylbewerber) or those who have been given a temporary stay of deportation (Geduldete). Those affected are required to live within certain boundaries defined by the applicants' local foreigners' office (Ausländerbehörde).

== Legal basis ==
Applications for refugee status are required at all times to reside in the district of their local foreigner's office (§56 and §85 of the German Refugee Processing Law - the Asylverfahrensgesetz). Foreigners with a stay of deportation are generally required to stay within the boundaries of their federal state (ranging from small city-states such as Bremen to larger states such as Bavaria) and are regulated by §61 and §95 of the German Residence Act (Aufenthaltsgesetz)

Foreigner who contravene the relevant legislation mentioned above can be imprisoned or face fines.

== Political context ==
The Residenzpflicht is unique to Germany. A 2007 complaint to the European Court of Human Rights was not accepted for judgment. Several immigrant and refugee advocacy organisations oppose the Residenzpflicht as a violation of fundamental human rights
