= 2015–2016 German migrant crisis =

Increasing number of migrant arrivals and societal reaction

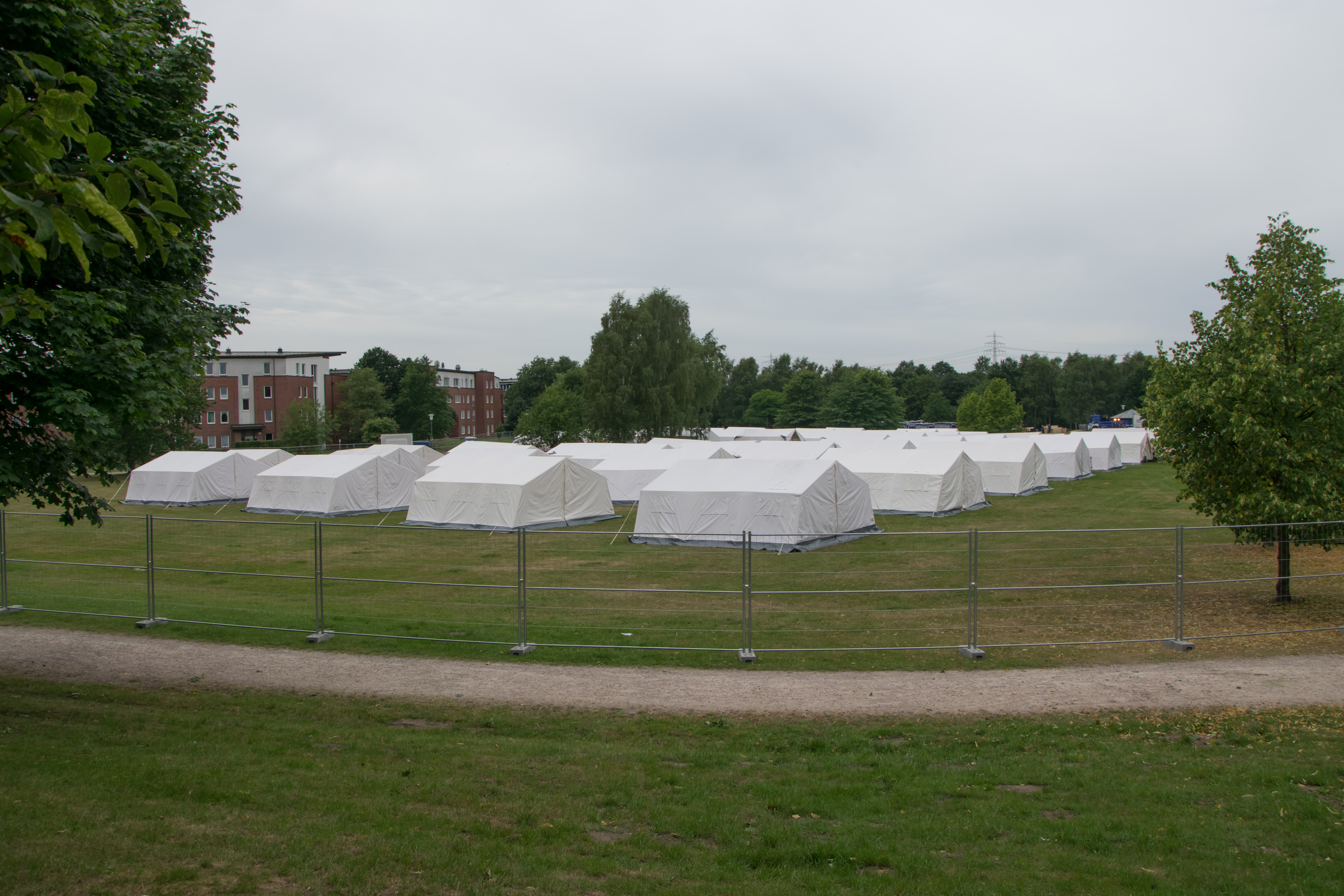
initial reception center: Jenfelder Moorpark, a tent camp in Hamburg-Jenfeld in July 2015

Number of asylum applications in the EU as a whole (black and white) and in nine European countries (Germany light purple), source: Eurostat

Asylum seekers according to the Central Register of Foreigners as of December 31, 2017 – total (per 1,000 inhabitants)

The 2015–2016 German migrant crisis refers to the situation for the German state and society that arose in connection with the entry of over one million refugees, migrants and other asylum seekers into Germany in 2015 and 2016. It is part of the Europe-wide refugee crisis and reached its peak in autumn 2015. For 2015 and 2016, a total of 1,855,522 initial registrations in EASY (initial distribution of asylum seekers) and 1,222,194 asylum applications were recorded.

Following the extensive closure of the Western Balkanroute and the EU-Turkey Statement of 18 March 2016, significantly fewer asylum seekers came to Germany on average each month. In 2017, their number fell to the level of 2014.

The large influx of people seeking protection within a short period of time triggered a social debate in Germany about the direction of the European Union's asylum and refugee policy and Germany's immigration and refugee policy. When it comes to the reception of migrants by the population in Germany and how they are treated, there is a wide spectrum of attitudes and behaviours, ranging from a welcoming culture (Willkommenskultur) to xenophobia. While on the one hand, various efforts have been and are being made to help immigrants and facilitate their integration, other efforts are aimed at deporting rejected asylum seekers as quickly as possible or closing the country's borders to unwanted immigration. The term "refugee crisis" as such is also controversial.

The political parties differ greatly in their ideas on migration and asylum policy. Important aspects of the debate are immigration control that meets humanitarian requirements and a supplementary immigration law with a focus on the labour market.

The Syrian civil war was one of the main reasons why many people fled to Germany. According to German asylum law, the majority of refugees from Syria are only entitled to subsidiary protection; comparatively few are entitled to asylum beyond this.

To combat the causes of refugee immigration to Germany, the federal government increased its contributions to international aid programs and was the second largest donor to the UNHCR in 2017. More humanitarian aid was also provided by the United Nations and the European Union. In addition to Syrians, Iraqis and refugees from other countries in the Near East, large numbers of those seeking asylum in Germany in 2015/16 also included Afghans and migrants from Africa and from non-EU countries in the Balkans.

== Creation ==
In 2017, migration researcher Jochen Oltmer highlighted six elements of a complex interrelationship as important factors for the drastic increase in refugee migration to Germany in 2015:

- The main countries of origin, Syria, Iraq and Southeast Europe, are relatively close to the EU, which made the effort (time and costs) of fleeing seem manageable.
- Germany became the most important European destination for people seeking protection or asylum because migrant networks of various origins had long existed here and could serve as contact points.
- Since the early 2010s, against the backdrop of demographic change and an emerging shortage of skilled workers in Germany, an increased willingness to accept refugees has been observed – in conjunction with the acceptance of human rights standards and the right to protection, especially for Syrian refugees.
- The destabilisation of a number of countries bordering the EU in the wake of the 2008 financial crisis – including Libya, Tunisia, Morocco, Albania and Ukraine – eliminated the migration barriers previously negotiated with the respective governments and enabled an increased influx of refugees.
- The states on the EU's external borders that are responsible for the initial reception of refugees under the Dublin III Regulation were overwhelmed by the influx, especially Greece and Italy. In 2015, the European internal area (particularly Germany, Denmark and Sweden) also became a migration destination.
- As the willingness to accept migrants decreased significantly, even in traditional asylum countries such as France and Great Britain, Germany became a replacement destination country in 2015.

According to Stefan Luft, the general factors in the selection of a migrant's destination country include political and economic stability and the reputation of a country. The Federal Republic of Germany is considered - regardless of possible differences between external perception and internal perspective - "as one of the most important economic powers in the world, as the dominant force in the European Union and as an open, liberal country". In addition, there are diaspora communities with corresponding networks in Germany, especially Syrian ones, which are also the focus of German reception policy. "This should make integration easier and the financial risks (health insurance, etc.) should be transferred to relatives." The acceleration of chain migration processes has occurred as an unintended side effect.

== Measures of the federal government ==
=== Measures in the European and constitutional context ===
==== Background: Dublin Regulations and suspension of transfers to Greece ====
Under the Dublin II Regulation, which was in force from 2003 to 2013, the member states of the European Union, as well as Norway, Iceland, Switzerland and Liechtenstein, were obliged to examine 'every application for asylum lodged by a third country national at the border or on the territory of a member state'. The Dublin III Regulation, which came into force in 2013, contains a similar requirement, but now refers to 'application for international protection' instead of 'asylum application'. However, the Federal Office for Migration and Refugees (BAMF) continues to refer to asylum application and asylum procedure as generic terms, which is why the terms are used as such in the following.

According to the regulations, the asylum application was and is examined (in material law) by a single state, i.e. the asylum procedure is carried out by a single state, which is determined according to certain criteria and in an order of examination. If the applicant submits the application at an external border of the area of application, the relevant state is usually responsible; if the applicant entered the country illegally, the state through which the asylum seeker entered the European Union is usually responsible. The states in which the application was submitted also have the right, under the so-called sovereignty clauses or the right of self-intervention, to examine an application themselves, i.e. to carry out the asylum procedure themselves.

Following this, the Federal Constitutional Court provisionally suspended transfers to Greece, beginning with a decision on 8 September 2009. On 13 January 2011, the Federal Ministry of the Interior under Minister Thomas de Maizière instructed the Federal Office for Migration and Refugees not to carry out any transfers to Greece for a year and instead to exercise its right of intervention and to conduct the asylum procedures itself. The Federal Constitutional Court then did not make any further decisions on the main issue.

On 21 January 2011, the European Court of Human Rights (ECHR) ruled in the case of an Afghan who had entered the European Union via Greece, was detained there for a week and then ordered to leave the country, then travelled to Belgium, applied for asylum there and was to be transferred to Greece under the Dublin II procedure, that both Greece and Belgium had violated Article 3 of the European Convention on Human Rights. In December 2011, in the context of possible transfers to Greece, the European Court of Justice (ECJ) issued a ruling compatible with the ruling of the European Court of Human Rights on the basis of Article 4 of the Charter of Fundamental Rights of the European Union, which in turn corresponds to Article 3 of the European Convention on Human Rights. In 2011, the other member states of the European Union also suspended transfers to Greece under the Dublin procedure.

Furthermore, administrative courts had reservations about transfers to other countries. In November 2010, for the first time, an administrative court suspended the transfer of a refugee to Italy on the grounds of inadequate social standards, and other courts followed suit.

The directive not to transfer asylum seekers to Greece under the Dublin Regulations was subsequently extended from year to year and then again in January 2016 for six months. When the directive was extended for 2013, the Federal Ministry of the Interior announced that the Greek asylum system still had serious deficiencies. In a letter to the state interior ministers in January 2016, Federal Minister of the Interior Thomas de Maizière stated that the treatment of asylum seekers in Greece did not always meet European standards.

Based on these instructions, from 2011 to 2016, asylum applications from third-country nationals submitted in Germany or at the borders of Germany, where the examination under the Dublin Regulations, without taking into account the situation in Greece, would have shown that Greece was responsible for carrying out the asylum procedure, were always examined in Germany.

When drafting the Dublin III Regulation, the court rulings of the ECHR and the ECJ were taken into account (in Article 3, Paragraph 2, Sentence 2 of the Dublin III Regulation). The Dublin III Regulation also contains a six-month deadline for transfers (Article 29, Paragraph 2, Sentence 1 of the Dublin III Regulation). After this deadline has expired, the country carrying out the Dublin procedure automatically becomes responsible. In the case of a person who entered Greece illegally from Turkey and then applied for asylum in Germany, Germany would therefore automatically have been responsible after six months at the latest without using the right of self-submission. By using the right of self-submission, Germany has anticipated this automatism.

==== The beginning of the crisis ====
As early as 2012, Greece had set up an automatic surveillance system on the Evros river, its border with Turkey, as well as a border fence where the river does not form the natural border between the states. People trying to enter Greece were intercepted at the river by Turkish border officials. Furthermore, since 2013 there have been reports of rejections and so-called push-backs by Greek border officials without the opportunity to apply for asylum. In January 2014, Bulgaria responded to increasing illegal entries by building a fence on its border with Turkey. From 2014 onwards, Syrians and people of other nationalities who were in Turkey and intended to apply for asylum in Europe, or who were travelling to Turkey for this purpose, generally crossed the sea between the Turkish coast and an offshore Greek island, thus entering Greece illegally. If these persons then travelled on to Germany and applied for asylum there, Germany exercised its right of self-intervention under the Dublin Regulation in accordance with the order of the Federal Minister of the Interior and took over the examination of the asylum application.

In the first half of 2015, Italy also complained about being overloaded due to the Dublin system, with Italian Prime Minister Matteo Renzi calling the Dublin Regulation "wrong and harmful". According to estimates by the International Organization for Migration (IMO), in the first quarter of 2015, half of the people who landed in Italy and subsequently applied for asylum in the EU travelled on to other EU countries, such as Germany, without registering or applying for asylum. Around 40 percent of asylum seekers registered in the EU applied in Germany, compared to only 8 percent in Italy.

Hungary became an important transit country, but also a country in which many applications were submitted. In 2014, there were around 40,000, of which only 550 were accepted. The Hungarian government responded to the high number of applications by deciding in July 2015 to secure the border with Serbia with a border fence. At the same time, asylum law was tightened: On 1 August 2015, Serbia was declared a safe third country, which enabled rapid deportations. In the whole of 2015, only 146 people were granted asylum out of approximately 25,000 completed applications. After German courts had already criticized inadequacies in the Hungarian asylum system in previous years, German administrative courts subsequently had even greater doubts about the asylum procedure in Hungary and suspended transfers.

The European Commission planned a revision of the Dublin system, but Eastern and Central European countries and France opposed it. Mixed signals emerged from Germany. For example, Federal Interior Minister de Maizière declared in June 2015 that the system must remain in force, while Chancellor Angela Merkel, in a summer interview with ARD, called for a "fair burden sharing" because otherwise the Schengen Agreement would not survive.

On 21 August 2015, Department 411 of the Federal Office for Migration and Refugees (BAMF), responsible for fundamental issues relating to Dublin, apprehension procedures, and EURODAC, issued a "procedural regulation for the suspension of the Dublin procedure for Syrian nationals." This regulation stated that no "Dublin procedure" should be initiated for new applications from Syrian nationals. According to a later statement from the BAMF, the document was a guideline of the Federal Office and not a formally binding requirement; it served to "simplify and accelerate administration".

This became public knowledge on 25 August 2015, through a report in the magazine Der Spiegel. The report stated that it could be "assumed that Syrian refugees can now firmly expect to be allowed to remain in the Federal Republic". In response to press inquiries, the office also posted the message "#Dublin proceedings involving Syrian nationals are, in fact, largely not being pursued by us at the present time" on Twitter on 25 August 2015.

The Twitter message quickly spread among asylum seekers who were in Hungary or on their way there via the so-called "Balkanroute". The impression arose that no one applying for asylum in Germany would be transferred to another country, which was generally true due to the order prohibiting transfers to Greece in place since 2011 and the internal guideline of August 21, 2015. Furthermore, asylum seekers in Hungary often refused to register as such, citing the Twitter message.

Against this backdrop and in light of the public debate surrounding the non-binding BAMF guidelines, Chancellor Angela Merkel stated at the Federal Government's summer press conference on 31 August 2015, that she believes Germany is prepared for an increasing number of arriving refugees. The phrase "Wir schaffen das" (We can do this), used in this context as a repetition of a phrase coined by Vice Chancellor Sigmar Gabriel, has since become synonymous with the challenges associated with the number of refugees in the refugee crisis.

More and more asylum seekers travelled via Hungary to Austria across the Austria–Hungary border, and most of them continued on to Germany, where they then applied for asylum. On August 31 alone, approximately 3,650 asylum seekers arrived at Vienna's Wien Westbahnhof railway station.

The following day, 1 September 2015, Budapest's main train station was sealed off, and asylum seekers were turned away. Long-distance traffic to Austria was suspended. Chancellor Merkel also declared on that day that the current legal situation, namely the Dublin Regulation, applied. During these days, mutual accusations arose between politicians from Germany, Austria, and Hungary.

On 3 September, a train arrived at the overcrowded Budapest Keleti station. Refugees who had purchased tickets to or from Austria were told they could take the train. This was a ruse, however: the train stopped in the town of Bicske, 35 km from Budapest, and the refugees were told to go to a refugee camp there, which they did not do and remained on the train. Refugees at Budapest Keleti station subsequently refused to board the train.

==== Peak of the crisis: "emergency aid" and reintroduction of border controls ====
More and more people camped in the basement of Budapest Keleti railway station; on the night of 4 September, there were about 3,000. In the morning, a large group of people seeking protection set out on foot from Budapest towards Austria and then walked along the Autobahn M1.

At around 4:30 pm, Hungarian Foreign Minister Péter Szijjártó told Austrian Foreign Minister Sebastian Kurz at a meeting of EU foreign ministers in Luxembourg that Hungarian Prime Minister Viktor Orbán wanted to be asked either to stop the asylum seekers or to let them go on, which would mean they would no longer be his problem. At 7:30 pm, a diplomatic note to this effect was received by the Austrian Foreign Ministry. Austrian Chancellor Werner Faymann then called Chancellor Angela Merkel, and suggested that the asylum seekers should not be stopped, and asked that Germany take in half of the people. Shortly after the phone call, at 9 p.m., the Hungarian ambassador in Berlin, on Viktor Orbán's instructions, announced that Hungary could no longer guarantee the registration of the asylum seekers and was now bringing them to the Austrian border in around 100 buses. An investigation by the Federal Foreign Office, initiated by Angela Merkel , showed that entry and the processing of asylum procedures in Germany were possible due to the right of voluntary intervention under the Dublin III Regulation. Merkel and Faymann then decided not to carry out border controls and, in particular, not to prevent asylum seekers from entering the country. At midnight, a message about the possibility of entry into Austria, written primarily by Péter Szijjártó, Sebastian Kurz, and German Foreign Minister Frank-Walter Steinmeier, was published and disseminated by Faymann on Facebook, also in English. During the night, around 4,000 asylum seekers were taken by bus to the Austrian border and then walked into Germany.

The message on Faymann's Facebook page read: "Due to the current emergency situation at the Hungarian border, Austria and Germany agree in this case that the refugees can continue their journey to their countries". The media also portrayed Merkel and Faymann's decisions as an "exceptional regulation" and "emergency aid" in an "emergency situation"; Merkel also retrospectively justified them with a "humanitarian emergency". However, the failure to carry out border controls was in line with the rules normally applicable in the Schengen area, from which deviations are only permitted in exceptional cases; even before that, asylum seekers had entered Austria and Germany unhindered. Furthermore, the Dublin procedure was no longer applied in Germany for Syrian asylum seekers as of 21 August.

On the weekend of September 5 and 6 alone, around 20,000 people traveled from Hungary to Germany by train, whereupon Hungarian Prime Minister Viktor Orban called on Germany to close its borders. In September 2015, thousands of asylum seekers entered Germany every day. The number of asylum seekers crossing the German border in Bavaria in September 2015, at least 135,000, exceeded the total number of those arriving there in the previous eight months. On 11 September 2015, the interior ministers of the federal states declared that the reception capacities were largely exhausted.

Under this impression, Germany became the first Schengen state to reintroduce border controls at its internal border with Austria on 13 September 2015. Denmark, Sweden, Austria, and Norway followed suit with their own border controls. Hungary completed its border fence on 14 September 2015.

The Federal Police established five border crossing points to regulate the crossing of refugees and migrants from Austria to Germany: Freilassing, Laufen an der Salzach, Neuhaus am Inn, Passau and Simbach am Inn. Border controls were reintroduced in accordance under Regulation (EU) 2016/399 (Schengen Borders Code), which expressly provided for the possibility of temporarily reintroducing border controls at the internal borders of the Schengen states (in Articles 23 to 26a of Regulation (EU) No 1051/2013). Border controls are temporary and can be extended if necessary in consultation with the European Commission.

Prior to the introduction of border controls, it was expected that asylum seekers would also be turned away at the borders, particularly those without identity documents. According to journalist Robin Alexander, an order to reinstate border controls with Austria starting at 6:00 p.m. on Sunday, September 13, 2015, to temporarily suspend train traffic from Austria and to turn away asylum seekers seeking to travel to Germany from the safe third country of Austria had already been agreed upon by those responsible in the grand coalition in a telephone conference on September 11. The aim was to trigger a domino effect and force the countries on the Balkan route to close their borders as well. However, from 2:00 p.m. on September 13, disagreements again arose with senior officials in the Interior Minister's situation center regarding the enforcement of the order, so the minister again called Chancellor Angela Merkel, who was now reluctant to commit to a position. The deployment order was ultimately amended by the Interior Minister, and people wishing to apply for asylum were still allowed to enter from Austria without valid identity documents. Alexander wrote in 2017 that the Federal Interior Minister had deliberately kept his subsequent statement to the press brief and did not allow any further questions. As a result, the false report initially spread in the national and international press that Germany was turning away refugees without entry documents at the border. The number of refugees had thus briefly fallen, but smugglers quickly corrected this, and governments along the Balkan route also spread the information about the continued open border to Germany in order to counteract a backlog of asylum seekers in their countries. The German border remained open because no one in the federal government wanted to take political responsibility for the closure.

Whether and on what legal basis a rejection would have been possible is controversial among legal experts. The primacy of EU law over national law must be observed here. The question was and is whether Germany was obliged to implement a Dublin procedure if a person applies for asylum at a border crossing, or whether Germany can reject the person and refer them to the responsibility of a neighbouring country. The country responsible for implementing the Dublin procedure is always the one in whose territory the applicant is located (Article 20 (1) and (4) of the Dublin III Regulation). It is undisputed that a rejection at the border can take place as long as a person has not yet entered the territory. In 2018, Daniel Thym wrote in the Verfassungsblog that a person undergoing passport processing at a border crossing is already on German territory and therefore cannot simply be rejected at the border.

In 2016, Alexander Peukert, Christian Hillgruber, Ulrich Foerste and Holm Putzke with reference to the Schengen Agreement, took the view that a person only enters German territory upon entry. Accordingly, Peukert, Hillgruber, Foerste and Putzke, in contrast to Thym, came to the conclusion that a rejection at border crossings would have been in accordance with the Dublin III Regulation. Independently of this, Kay Hailbronner and Daniel Thym considered in 2016 that a closure of the EU's internal borders and rejection on the grounds of maintaining public order and protecting internal security was conceivable in a comparable situation, with reference to Article 72 TFEU.

In January 2016, former constitutional judge Udo di Fabio even came to the conclusion in an expert opinion for the Free State of Bavaria that a border closure was necessary at that time (and thus certainly also in September 2015) . His central argument was that the "unregulated entry" endangered state structures, in particular the rule of law and the principle of democracy, the former because of the threat to public security (especially with regard to the sexual assaults of New Year's Eve 2015), the latter because the principle of democracy presupposes a "lawful and practically controllable population composition".

The number of asylum seekers remained extremely high even after the introduction of border controls. Up to eight special trains were deployed to transport refugees from Salzburg directly to German reception centers. For example, the city of Passau reported on 19 October that within three weeks, over 100,000 refugees had entered the country via the border between Austria and Passau alone, or more than 4,750 people per day.

==== After the introduction of border controls ====
Germany's decision (due to the rulings of the ECHR and the ECJ and the ongoing situation in Greece) to exercise the right of self-intervention under the Dublin III Regulation for Syrian nationals without conducting a Dublin procedure, was met with opposition and suspicion in many EU countries.

On 21 October 2015, the Federal Ministry of the Interior instructed the Federal Office for Migration and Refugees (BAMF) to resume the Dublin procedure as usual, while continuing to assume, in accordance with court rulings and long-standing practice in the Dublin procedure, that no transfers to Greece could be carried out.

Border fences were built at the Austrian border crossing at Spielfeld from Slovenia to Croatia and on the border between Greece and North Macedonia in 2015. Finally, from March 2016, travel via the so-called Balkanroute from North Macedonia, Serbia, Croatia, Hungary and Slovenia was prevented.

In the first half of 2016, there were significantly more transfers to Germany than vice versa. From January to May, Germany took in 5,467 asylum seekers, primarily from Sweden. During the same period, Germany submitted 18,668 transfer requests to other EU states. Of these, 7,410 were rejected; most of the others failed because the asylum seekers went into hiding. Only 1,453 cases were actually transferred. Because Hungary is the most reliable in its entry registration process, most transfer requests were submitted there. However, Hungary unilaterally limited the number of transfers to 12 asylum seekers per day under the Dublin procedure.

On 18 March 2016, the so-called EU-Turkey Agreement (which is not an international agreement) was adopted. The key aspect for the EU was: "All new 'irregular migrants' arriving on the Greek islands from 20 March 2016 onwards who do not apply for asylum or whose application is rejected as unfounded or inadmissible will be returned to Turkey at the expense of the European Union." However, this regulation was ineffective for Germany: Until 2024, Syrians whose asylum procedures were carried out in Germany were always granted at least subsidiary protection.

Despite border controls, there were cases of unauthorized entry. In the case of a migrant from Libya who fled to Germany for fear of prosecution for robbery and was unable to obtain subsidiary protection under either asylum law or as a refugee, the Koblenz Higher Administrative Court ruled on February 14, 2017 (case number: 13 UF 32/17): "The person concerned has indeed committed an offense under Sections 95 (1) No. 3 and 14 (1) Nos. 1 and 2 of the Residence Act by entering the Federal Republic of Germany illegally. This is because he cannot invoke Section 15 (4) Sentence 2 of the Residence Act or Section 95 (5) of the Residence Act in conjunction with Article 31 (1) of the Refugee Convention. However, the rule of law in the Federal Republic of Germany has been suspended in this area for approximately one and a half years, and illegal entry into the federal territory is currently de facto no longer prosecuted."

==== Aftermath ====
Various EU countries tightened their asylum legislation in the following years, for example France in 2018.

The distribution of refugees, who primarily wanted to go to Germany and Sweden, caused a dispute among the member states of the European Union that remains unresolved. While Germany and the European Union have advocated that asylum seekers should be distributed among all European states since the refugee crisis, Eastern European states have opposed such a solution.

The Dublin Regulation remains in force to this day. Although the Dublin rules stipulate that asylum applications should be processed in the EU country where the refugees first set foot on European soil, this rarely happens these days. EU Commissioner for Home Affairs Dimitris Avramopoulos expressed this in 2018: "Dublin, as we know it, is dead".

=== Domestically ===
==== Bundeswehr deployment for crisis management ====
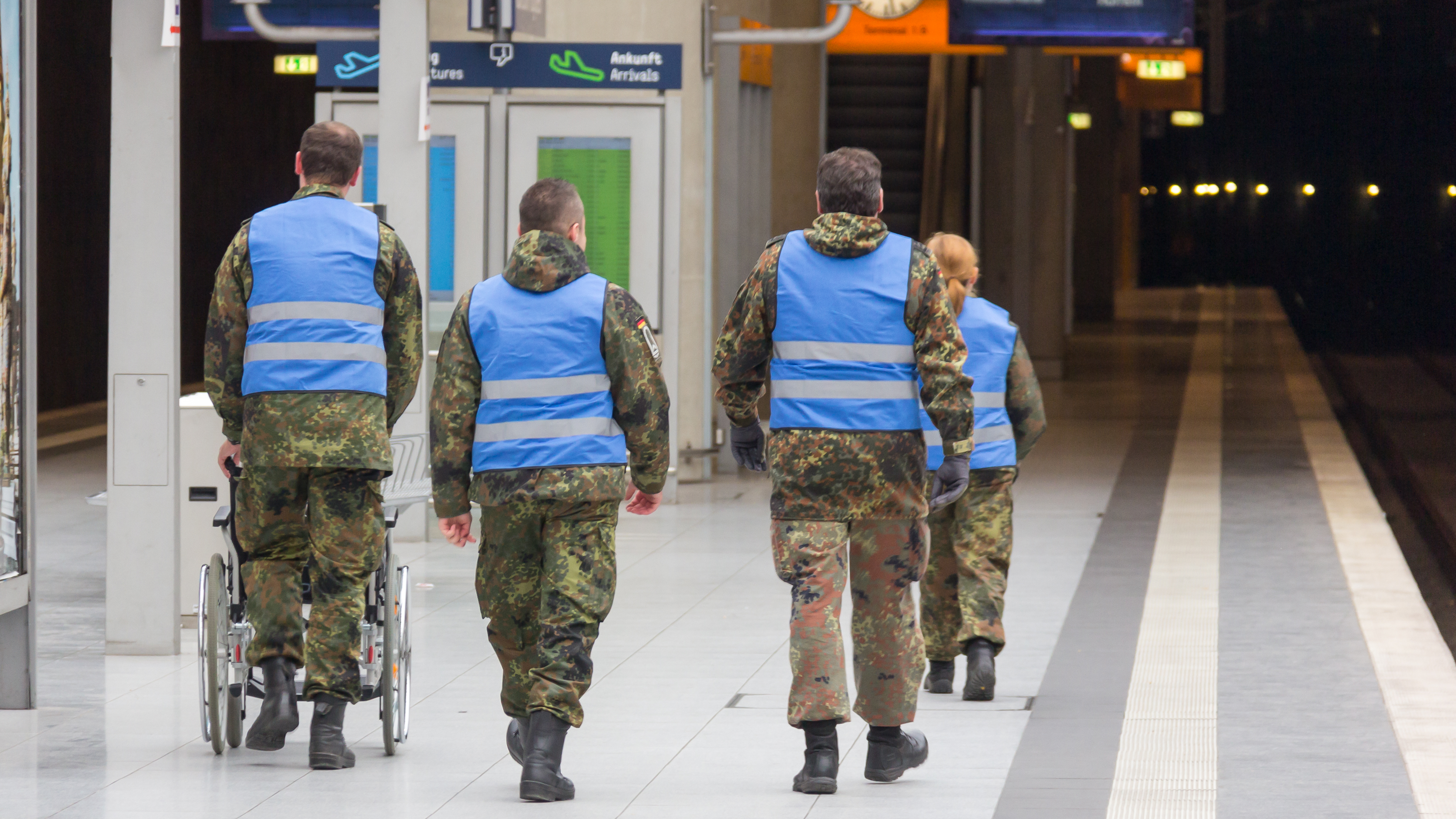
Cologne/Bonn hub arrival area, 5 October 2015

Starting in June 2015, the Bundeswehr responded to 850 requests for assistance from states and municipalities in its longest and most personnel-intensive domestic deployment to date. 170,000 accommodation places were provided and 200,000 asylum seekers were transported. After the refugee wave subsided, personnel were seconded to the Federal Office for Migration and Refugees.

==== Reforms in registration, data exchange and identity verification ====
===== Registration and comparison of fingerprints =====
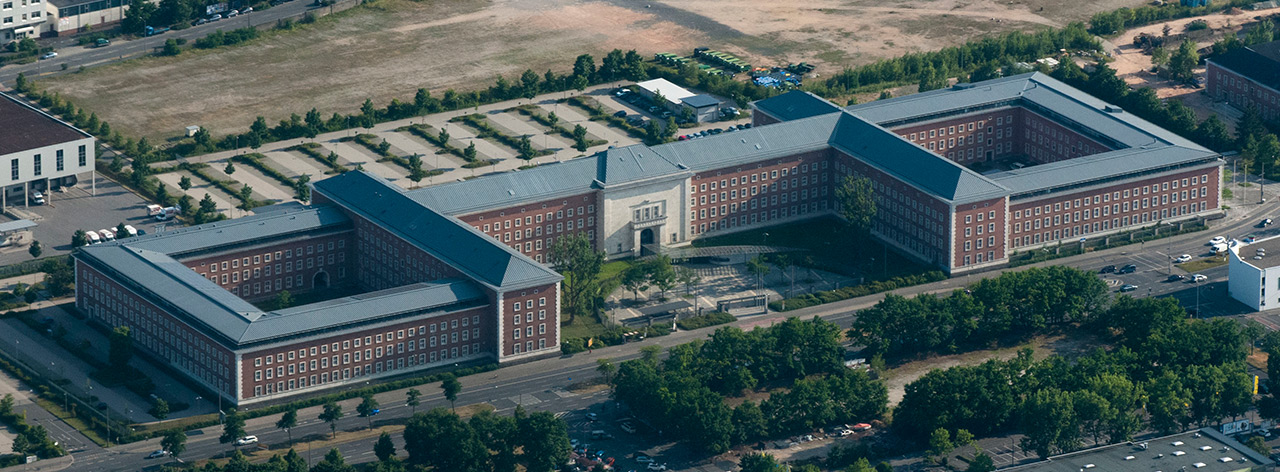
BAMF headquarters in Nuremberg, 2014

According to the police unions Gewerkschaft der Polizei (GdP) and the Deutsche Polizeigewerkschaft, only a fraction of the foreign nationals who entered Germany without being checked were fingerprinted in the final months of 2015. In October 2015, the European Commission sent letters of formal notice to Greece, Croatia, and Italy, urging them to correctly apply Regulation (EU) No. 603/2013 (the Eurodac Regulation). Two months later, it was determined that the Member States concerned had not complied with the letters of formal notice. The European Commission subsequently again called on these countries to comply with this EU regulation in December 2015.

As recently as February 2017, only 10 percent of German immigration authorities had the technical capabilities to electronically capture fingerprints and compare them with the Core Data System (KDS) of the Central Register of Foreign Nationals operated by the Federal Office of Administration. Approximately 13,900 authorities from the areas of residence and asylum, police, security and justice, as well as other users, are connected to the KDS, which was expanded to include fingerprints as part of the digitalization of the asylum process. The Federal Office for Migration and Refugees (BAMF) has been able to take and compare fingerprints from all refugees since autumn 2016. The scans are sufficient for establishing identity, but are sometimes unusable for forensic investigations.

At the end of May 2017, the Federal Office for Migration and Refugees (BAMF) discovered that several thousand people had already been granted asylum without having previously undergone a fingerprinting process. In May 2018, Die Welt published an article quoting an internal letter from the BAMF's Quality Assurance Department dated 11 May, stating that the fingerprinting of applicants was still regularly not being carried out.

===== Registration systems and data exchange =====
In December 2016, the suspect in the murder of Maria Ladenburger – a sexual crime committed on 16 October 2016, in Freiburg im Breisgau – was arrested. In the course of this, media reported on gaps in German and European IT registration systems for refugees on the one hand and for criminals on the other, through which criminals can slip unnoticed. The investigation into the attack on the Berlin Christmas market at the Gedächtniskirche, which took place shortly afterwards, also addressed similar problems. The following examples demonstrate deficiencies in official data exchange and related remedial steps:

- Afis-A and Afis-P are automated fingerprint identification systems (AFIS) of the German police. Until the beginning of 2016, only the police had access to the Automated Fingerprint Identification System Police (Afis-P), which only stores fingerprint-related data for the purposes of law enforcement or police threat prevention. Only the immigration authorities had access to the Automated Fingerprint Identification System Asylum (Afis-A), which only records data from asylum seekers as part of the identification process (ED processing) for the purpose of conducting the asylum procedure . The two systems are now linked, so that both the police and the immigration authorities have access to the data stored in these systems. Both Afis-P and Afis-A are part of the INPOL database of the Federal Criminal Police Office (BKA). The head of the BKA, Holger Münch, considers INPOL to be too old and too slow.
- The nationwide core data system (KDS) based on the Central Register of Foreigners (AZR), which was established as part of the digitalisation of the asylum procedure and through whose queries the immigration and registration authorities responsible for foreigners who have entered the country without supervision can rule out multiple identities, was only gradually introduced in the first half of 2016. However, the Berlin attacker Anis Amri came to Germany from Italy in the summer of 2015 and was registered there on July 6, 2015, in Freiburg im Breisgau by the Freiburg Criminal Investigation Department K8 under the personal name Anis Amir (sic).

===== Identity verification via passports =====
The police union Gewerkschaft der Polizei estimates that only around 25 to 30 percent of asylum seekers who entered Germany in 2015 had a passport. It is also known that both blank Syrian ID cards and ID software, devices, and stamps may have fallen into the hands of criminal organizations, meaning that criminal or terrorist organizations may be able to produce technically authentic passports with false information. The General Staff Council of the Federal Office for Migration and Refugees (BAMF) warned in November 2015 that the accelerated asylum procedure without identification for people claiming to be Syrians represents an increased risk potential, as it makes it easier for IS fighters to infiltrate Central Europe. According to the General Staff Council, Syrian passports were not checked for authenticity in November 2015; for asylum seekers without passports, identification is even waived entirely. In December 2015, against the backdrop of forged or stolen passports, there were renewed calls in Germany for immediate, individual review of asylum applications from Syrian asylum seekers. Ansgar Heveling (CDU), Chairman of the Interior Committee of the German Bundestag , called for "above all, in Europe, the fastest possible, complete registration of all people who arrive here." Burkhard Lischka (SPD) also emphasized the importance of "immediate, individual review by German authorities of those who have fled Syria". On 3 December 2015, the Conference of Interior Ministers in Koblenz decided, for security reasons, to return to the regular individual review of asylum applications with personal interviews, including for asylum seekers from Syria, Iraq, Afghanistan, and Eritrea. This was decided with effect from 1 January 2016.

At the beginning of August 2016, Katja Wilken-Klein of the BAMF stated that all asylum seekers had been registered and checked by the police. In mid-August 2016 , the Bavarian Interior Minister Joachim Herrmann accused the BAMF of inadequate screening of asylum seekers, calling this an unacceptable security deficit, because: "We now know that IS has also deliberately used these security gaps to smuggle terrorists into Europe disguised as asylum seekers." During a random check of the passports of asylum seekers in Bavaria, a significant proportion of forged passports and incorrect identity information were discovered. In September 2016, 3,300 passports of asylum seekers were checked in Mecklenburg-Western Pomerania, and 140 forged passports were discovered, some of which had been declared authentic by the BAMF in expert opinions. In mid-September 2016, Brandenburg's Attorney General, Erardo Cristoforo Rautenberg, wanted to have around 18,000 BAMF data records seized for review. According to RBB, these were the data of refugees who had arrived in Brandenburg by train from Hungary or Austria between 5 September and 22 December 2015, and who could not be identified by the Federal Police due to capacity constraints. However, the BAMF refused to release the data, arguing that refugees could not be placed under such general suspicion, as the Frankfurt (Oder) Regional Court ruled. By February 2017, the public prosecutor's office had subsequently reviewed 1,000 of the 18,000 cases in complex, individual proceedings that were unique in Germany. It was determined that 15–20% of the people could no longer be found.

==== Acceleration of ongoing asylum procedures ====
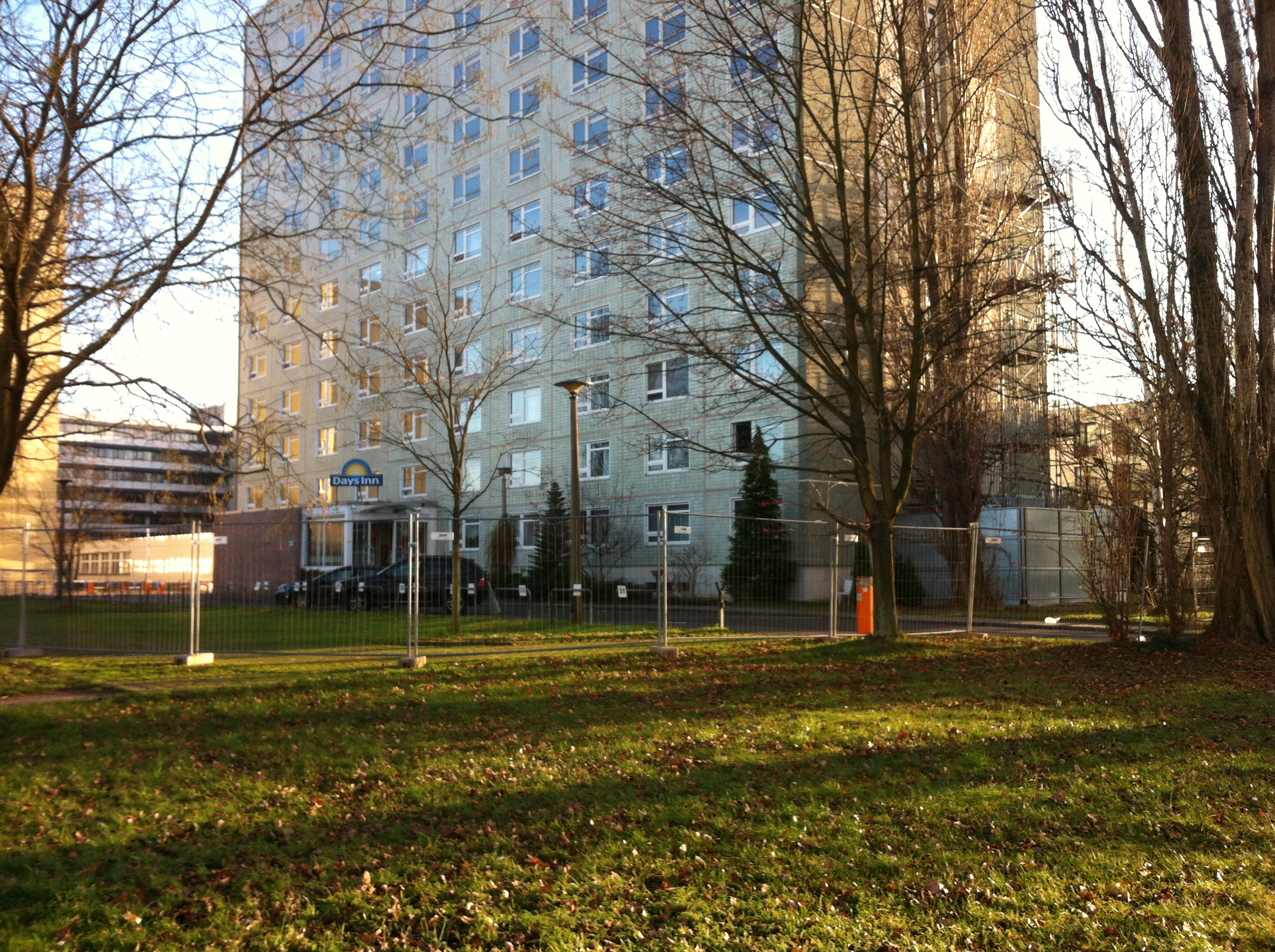
Guarded hotel in Dresden, refugee accommodation in winter 2015/2016

For applicants for whom Germany was responsible under the Dublin III Regulation (which affected all persons who had entered the EU via Greece) and whose identity was established, an accelerated procedure was introduced on 26 June 2015. A similar accelerated procedure was applied for Mandaeans, Yazidis and Iraqi Christians. Their applications are approved solely on the basis of a written application. The so-called revocation review was also waived until 1 August 2015, when the Act on the Redefinition of the Right of Residence and the Termination of Residence came into force. In the opinion of the General Staff Council of the BAMF, the accelerated asylum procedure for Syrians and Eritreans did not follow the rule of law. For example, no identity check is carried out for asylum seekers who are Syrians or who claim to be Syrians . Refugee status was subsequently granted only when an interpreter, who was usually neither sworn in nor himself from Syria, confirmed an asylum seeker as a Syrian. For refugees who could present a Syrian passport , decision-makers were "required to grant refugee status to this group of persons without verifying their authenticity." This procedure was inadequate, as numerous Syrian passports were forged and a large number of asylum seekers provided false identities in order to obtain the prospect of remaining in the country with the possibility of family reunification etc. The accelerated procedure was in force until the end of 2015.

Federal Interior Minister Thomas de Maizière estimated the proportion of "fake Syrians" at 30 percent in the fall of 2015. When it became public that he had no data to support this, the opposition accused him of stirring up rumours. In 2016, a confidential Frontex screening revealed that approximately 14 percent of refugees arriving in Greece in 2015 falsely identified themselves as Syrians in order to have a better chance of being allowed to stay. This trend continued in 2016.

As of the beginning of September 2015, the Federal Office for Migration and Refugees (BAMF) had received many unprocessed asylum applications. In order to complete more asylum procedures per month, the number of employees was increased to 7,300 in 2016 and, through secondments from other authorities, to a total of 9,000 employees. The increase in asylum procedures and the accelerated processing at the Federal Office also led, with a time delay, to a significant increase in legal action and urgent legal protection proceedings at the administrative courts. According to the figures published for Brandenburg, the number of new applications received by the three Brandenburg administrative courts rose from a total of 2,859 (2014) to 5,707 (2015), 7,106 (2016), and 6,805 in the first half of 2017 alone.

The development of the number of pending cases depends primarily on the monthly addition of new cases and the number of applications decided. Since the fourth quarter of 2016, significantly more applications have been decided than new cases:

In April 2019, the Federal Office for Migration and Refugees (BAMF) amended its guidelines on Syria: in certain cases, only a deportation ban should be granted instead of subsidiary protection status. However, for the purpose of coordination with the Federal Ministry of the Interior, some of the procedures for Syrian asylum seekers were temporarily postponed at the end of April.

==== Financial and social policy development ====
Due to the large number of asylum seekers, the German federal government increased financial resources for refugees by one billion euros in 2015 and made an additional six billion euros available for 2016. These measures were intended, among other things, to increase the budgets of job centres and the funds for job-related German language support. In addition, direct financial assistance was to be partially replaced by benefits in kind. It was also agreed to increase the budget of the Federal Foreign Office by 400 million euros annually to combat the causes of mass migration. The federal government, states, and municipalities finance a 600-hour German language course for asylum seekers with good prospects of being able to stay. The Federal Employment Agency and the Federal Office for Migration and Refugees were placed under the joint leadership of Frank-Jürgen Weise in order to enable individually tailored support for asylum seekers.

In September 2015, the Ifo Institute for Economic Research, however, estimated costs of €10 billion for the 800,000 refugees forecast for 2015 alone—the actual number at the turn of the year was around 900,000. This did not include educational measures and family reunification. However, these figures had to be significantly revised in December 2015, with the Ifo Institute now estimating costs of €21 billion for 2015 alone.

In October 2015, Chancellor Merkel promised that no taxes would be raised to finance the refugee crisis.

In February 2016, the finance ministers of Bavaria and North Rhine-Westphalia estimated the costs of integration services for the federal states at €20 to €25 billion for the current year. For North Rhine-Westphalia, they stated that federal reimbursement would amount to just under 20% of the costs, and for Bavaria, 17%. The planned cost reimbursements between states and municipalities also became a point of contention. The state of North Rhine-Westphalia only transferred a flat rate of €10,000 per refugee, which local government representatives considered insufficient to cover costs. For around 52,000 rejected asylum seekers in North Rhine-Westphalia in January 2016, who could not be deported and were merely tolerated, the state paid the flat rate for only three months per year.

The care of unaccompanied minor refugees proved to be costly. In February 2017, journalists estimated that Berlin's more than 2,700 unaccompanied minor refugees would cost 200 million euros per year.

==== Accelerated repatriation of rejected asylum seekers without passports from Balkan states ====
The German government started repatriating rejected asylum seekers from Balkan states without a valid passport based on the laissez-passer procedure. This procedure allows for voluntary return or deportation deportation even without a passport. The Balkan states declared their willingness to accept returnees. Furthermore, incentives for voluntary return have also been increased. More than 5,000 Kosovars received cash payments of up to €3,000 for their voluntary departure.

For returnees from Albania, Serbia, FYR Macedonia, and Kosovo, the REAG/GARP funding program only covered or covers transport costs (as of March 2015).

==== Special procedures for certain asylum seekers ====
On 3 December 2015, the Conference of Interior Ministers in Koblenz decided, for security reasons, to return to the regular individual examination of asylum applications with a personal interview for asylum seekers from Syria, Iraq, Afghanistan and Eritrea.

==== Changes to asylum law 2016 (Asylum Package II) ====
On 29 September 2015 , the Federal Cabinet adopted a legislative package with significant changes to German asylum law – Asylum Package I. In detail, the following measures were adopted:

1. Classification as a "safe country of origin": In order to expedite the deportation of asylum seekers from the Balkan states of Albania, Kosovo, and Montenegro, these countries were classified as "safe countries of origin". Asylum seekers from these countries are to remain in the initial reception centres until the asylum procedure is completed.
2. Accommodation in initial reception centers: Asylum seekers will be accommodated in initial reception centers for up to six months (previously, a maximum of three months was permitted) and will, if possible, receive only in-kind benefits instead of cash. In the future, payments will only be made up to one month in advance.
3. Unannounced deportation: In order to prevent people from going underground, the deportation of rejected asylum seekers will in future take place without prior notice.
4. Acceleration of asylum procedures: Asylum procedures should be completed within three months. The Federal Office for Migration and Refugees (BAMF) will increase its staffing levels to achieve this. Older procedures will be completed more quickly in the future thanks to more decision-makers.
5. Benefits in kind instead of money: In order to avoid giving financial incentives to asylum seekers who have come to Germany solely out of economic necessity, they should in future receive benefits in kind such as food, clothing, personal care products, tobacco products or tickets for public transport.
6. Federal financial aid: The federal government Bundesebene (Deutschland) pays the states a monthly flat rate of 670 euros for each refugee assigned, with the requirement that these funds be distributed to their municipalities.
7. Accommodation: Certain building regulations that would delay the construction of winter-proof quarters are suspended (e.g. regarding site selection, noise protection or the use of renewable energies).
8. Integration: Asylum seekers with good prospects of obtaining a residence permit are offered integration courses and German language courses, assistance with integration into the labor market is provided, and access to internships is facilitated.
9. Medical care: The federal government is creating the conditions for the states to be able to introduce a health card for refugees on a voluntary basis.

The changes to the asylum law introduced by Asylum Package I mostly came into force on 24 October 2015.

== Aftermath ==
=== Effects on politics ===
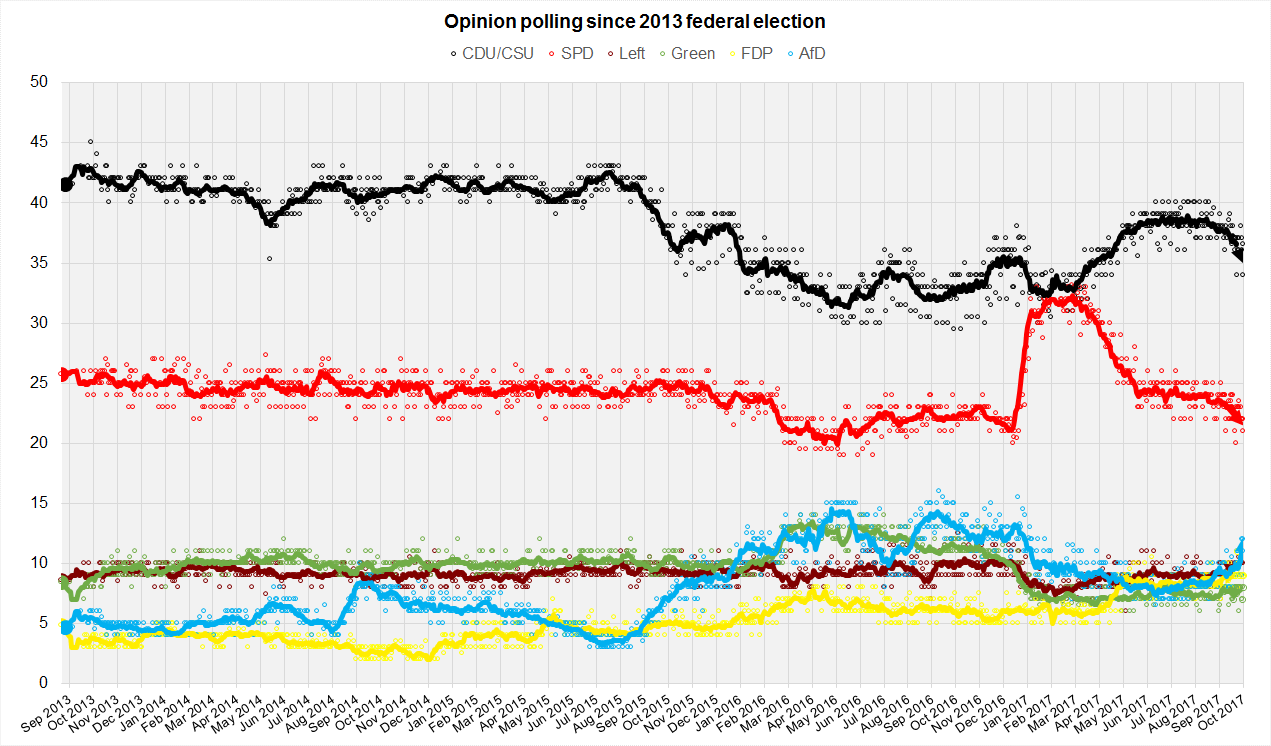
The Alternative for Germany (AfD) saw a surge in support after the migrant crisis

The Alternative for Germany (AfD) saw a surge in support after the migrant crisis.

With the European migrant crisis remaining the dominant national issue, elections on 13 March 2016 were held in the three states of Baden-Württemberg, Rhineland-Palatinate, and Saxony-Anhalt, and saw the AfD receiving double-digit percentages of the vote in all three states. In the 2016 Saxony-Anhalt state election, AfD reached second place in the Landtag, receiving 24.2% of the vote. In the 2016 Baden-Württemberg state election, AfD achieved third place, with 15.1% of the vote. In the 2016 Rhineland-Palatinate state election, AfD again reached third place, with 12.6% of the vote. In Angela Merkel's home state of Mecklenburg-Vorpommern, her CDU was beaten into third place following a strong showing of AfD, who contested at state level for the first time, to claim the second-highest polling with 20.8% of the vote in the 2016 state election.

=== Websites ===
- Schutzformen für geflüchtete Menschen (Hinweis zu Begrifflichkeiten). Bundesamt für Migration und Flüchtlinge (BAMF), retrieved 21 November 2017.
- Migrationspolitik – März 2016. Bundeszentrale für politische Bildung (pbb), 1. April 2016 (u. a. zum Rückgang der Flüchtlingszahlen nach Schließung der Balkanroute und zu den Hoffnungen in Bezug auf die Wirksamkeit des EU-Türkei-Abkommens).
- Das Migrationsgeschehen 2015 im Überblick. BAMF, 14 December 2016.
- Jahresbilanz des BAMF 2016. (PDF) BAMF, 11 January 2017 (Presseinformation zur Pressekonferenz 11 January 2017).
- Asylzahlen: Jahresbilanz 2016. BAMF, 11 January 2017.
- Fluchtmigration (PDF) Bundesagentur für Arbeit (BA) (Veröffentlichung vom December 2017).
- Asylzahlen: Jahresbilanz 2017. BAMF, 16 January 2018.
- UNHCR-Datenblatt. (Daten des UNHCR zur Einwanderung über das Mittelmeer in die EU.)
- Aktuelle Meldungen des BAMF.
- Themenseite: "Flucht und Asyl" In: Webpräsenz der deutschen Bundesregierung.
- Flüchtlingskrise auf dem Informationsportal zur politischen Bildung
