= Sahra Wagenknecht =

German politician (born 1969)

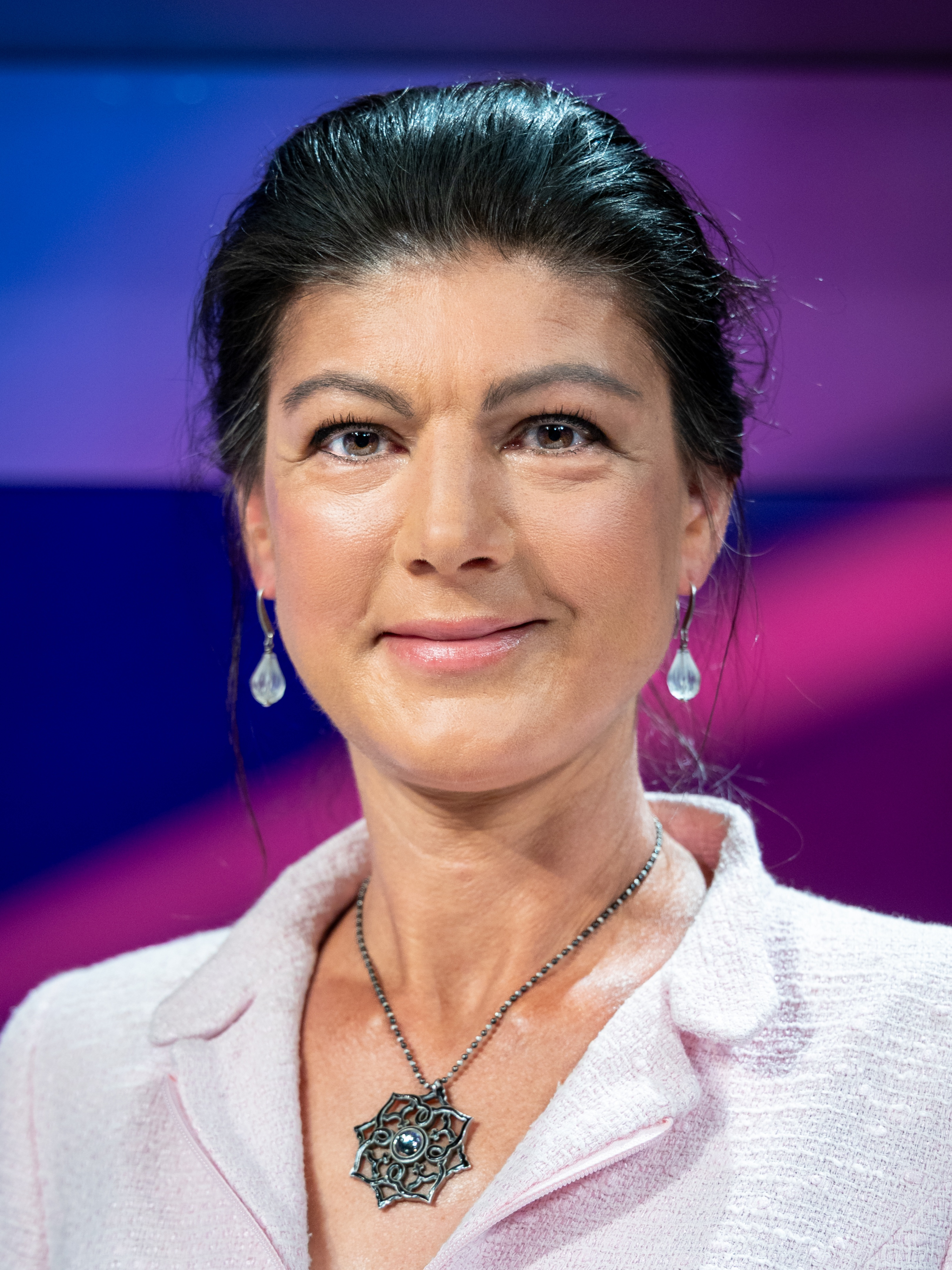
- Wagenknecht in 2025

Leader of the Sahra Wagenknecht Alliance
- In office 8 January 2024 – 10 November 2025 Serving with Amira Mohamed Ali
- General Secretary: Christian Leye
- Deputy: Shervin Haghsheno
- Preceded by: Position established
- Succeeded by: Fabio De Masi

Leader of the Alliance for Social Justice and Economic Reason in the Bundestag
- In office 11 December 2023 – 25 March 2025
- Whip: Jessica Tatti
- Deputy: Klaus Ernst
- Preceded by: Position established
- Succeeded by: Position abolished

Leader of the Opposition
- In office 12 October 2015 – 24 October 2017 Serving with Dietmar Bartsch
- Preceded by: Gregor Gysi
- Succeeded by: Alice Weidel; Alexander Gauland

Leader of The Left in the Bundestag
- In office 12 October 2015 – 12 November 2019 Serving with Dietmar Bartsch
- Whip: Jan Korte
- Deputy: Sevim Dağdelen; Caren Lay
- Preceded by: Gregor Gysi
- Succeeded by: Amira Mohamed Ali
Parliamentary constituencies
Member of the Bundestag for North Rhine-Westphalia
In office 27 October 2009 – 23 February 2025
Preceded by	Multi-member district
Constituency	The Left list
Member of the European Parliament for Germany
In office 20 July 2004 – 14 July 2009
Preceded by	Multi-member district
Succeeded by	Multi-member district
Constituency	Party of Democratic Socialism list

Personal details
- Born: 16 July 1969 (age 57) Jena, Bezirk Gera, East Germany (now Thuringia, Germany)
- Party: BSW (2023–present)
- Other political affiliations: SED (1989); PDS (1989–2007); The Left (2007–2023)
- Spouses: Ralph-Thomas Niemeyer (m. 1997; div. 2013); Oskar Lafontaine (m. 2014)
- Education: University of Groningen (MA); TU Chemnitz (PhD)
- Occupation: Politician; publicist; author
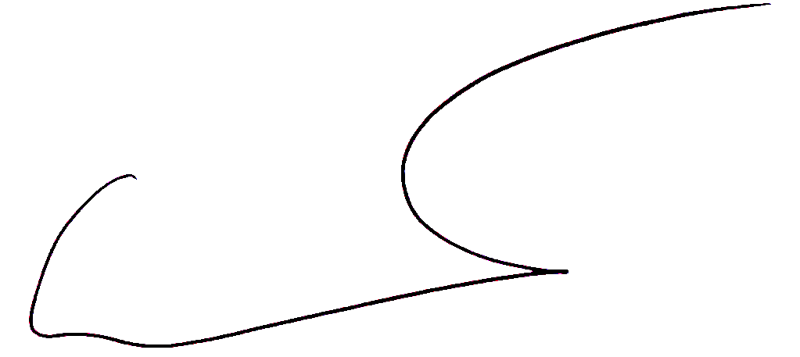
- Signature
- Website: sahra-wagenknecht.de

Sahra Wagenknecht (German: [ˌzaːʁa ˈvaːɡŋ̍ˌknɛçt]; 16 July 1969) is a German politician. She was a member of the Bundestag from 2009 to 2025, where she represented The Left until 2023. From 2015 to 2019, she served as that party's parliamentary co-chair. With a small team of allies, Wagenknecht left the party on 23 October 2023 to found her own Eurosceptic, populist party, Alliance for Social Justice and Economic Reason, which unsuccessfully contested the 2025 federal election, narrowly failing the 5% threshold. Since 2025, she has no longer held any public office.

Wagenknecht firstly joined the ruling SED months before the Berlin Wall fell in 1989, then became a prominent member of the PDS from the early 1990s. After the foundation of The Left in 2007, she was a leading member of one of the party's most left-wing factions as leader of the Communist Platform. Her economic views have shifted since then. In 2011, she laid them out in her book Freedom instead of Capitalism, in which she analysed Germany's economic policy at the time of the euro crisis and criticised it on the basis of ordoliberalism.

She was one of the main driving forces in the formation of Aufstehen, a left-wing political movement established in 2018, which exists outside of traditional political party structures and has been compared to the French movement La France Insoumise. She has made some controversial statements about immigration and refugees and gender affirming care. From 2020 onward Wagenknecht was less active in the Bundestag, but was often interviewed by German media. From 2021 to 2025 she was not a member of any parliamentary committee.

From 2021 she had openly considered forming her own party, due to growing and enduring conflicts within the Left Party. At the end of September 2023 Wagenknecht formed the Sahra Wagenknecht Alliance political party, better known as BSW (Bündnis Sahra Wagenknecht). She ran as the Chancellor candidate of the BSW in the 2025 German federal election. In November 2025 she announced her resignation as leader of BSW.

== Early life ==
Wagenknecht was born on 16 July 1969 in the East German city of Jena. Her father, who is Iranian, moved to West Berlin to study; her mother, who worked for a state-run art distributor, is German. Her father disappeared in Iran when she was a child. She was cared for primarily by her grandparents until 1976, when she and her mother moved to East Berlin. While in Berlin, she became a member of the Free German Youth (FDJ). She completed her Abitur exams in 1988 and joined the (then ruling) Socialist Unity Party (SED) in early 1989.

In 1990, German reunification occurred, ending the GDR. From 1990, Wagenknecht studied philosophy and modern German literature as an undergraduate in Jena and Berlin, completing the mandatory coursework, but did not write a thesis as she "could not find support for her research aims at the East Berlin Humboldt University". She then enrolled as a philosophy student at the University of Groningen, completing her studies and earning an MA in 1996 for a thesis on the young Karl Marx's interpretation of Hegel, supervised by Hans Heinz Holz and published as a book in 1997. From 2005 until 2012 she completed a PhD dissertation in microeconomics at TU Chemnitz, on "The Limits of Choice: Saving Decisions and Basic Needs in Developed Countries", awarded with the grade magna cum laude in the German system.

== Political career ==
After the fall of the Berlin Wall and the transformation of the SED into the Party of Democratic Socialism (PDS), Wagenknecht was elected to the new party's National Committee in 1991. She also joined the PDS's Communist Platform, a Marxist-Leninist faction.

In the 1998 German federal election, Wagenknecht ran as the PDS candidate in Dortmund I, garnering 3.25% of the vote. In the 2004 European election, she was elected as a PDS representative to the European Parliament. Among her duties in the parliament were serving on the Committee on Economic and Monetary Affairs and Delegation, as well as the Euro-Latin American Parliamentary Assembly.

Wagenknecht successfully contested a seat in the 2009 federal election in North Rhine-Westphalia. She became the Left Party's spokesperson for economic politics in the Bundestag. On 15 May 2010, she was at last elected vice president of the Left Party with 75.3% of the vote.

Early in 2012, the German press reported that Wagenknecht was one of 27 Left Party Bundestag members whose writings and speeches were being collected and analyzed by the Federal Office for the Protection of the Constitution.

She was one of the main driving forces in the formation of Aufstehen, a left-wing political movement established in 2018, which exists outside of traditional political party structures and has been compared to the French movement La France Insoumise. In March 2019, Wagenknecht announced her withdrawal from her leadership role within Aufstehen, citing personal workload pressures and insisting that after a successful start-up phase, for which political experience was necessary, the time had come for the movement's own grass roots to assume control. She complained that the involvement of political parties at its heart had "walled in" the movement. She would nonetheless continue to make public appearances on its behalf.

Wagenknecht was elected co-leader of the Left's Bundestag group in 2015 alongside Dietmar Bartsch succeeding long-time leader Gregor Gysi. Wagenknecht won 78.4% of votes cast. As the Left was at the time the largest opposition party in the Bundestag, she became a prominent leader of the opposition for the remainder of the parliamentary term. Bartsch and Wagenknecht were the Left's lead candidates for the 2017 federal election.

The biography Sahra Wagenknecht. Die Biografie by Christian Schneider was published in 2019 and focuses on Wagenknecht as a person, including her family background and interest in Johann Wolfgang von Goethe. In November 2019, she announced her resignation as parliamentary leader, citing burnout. Her activities from 2017 to 2019, culminating with her resignation, are covered in the 2020 documentary film Wagenknecht, directed by Sandra Kaudelka.

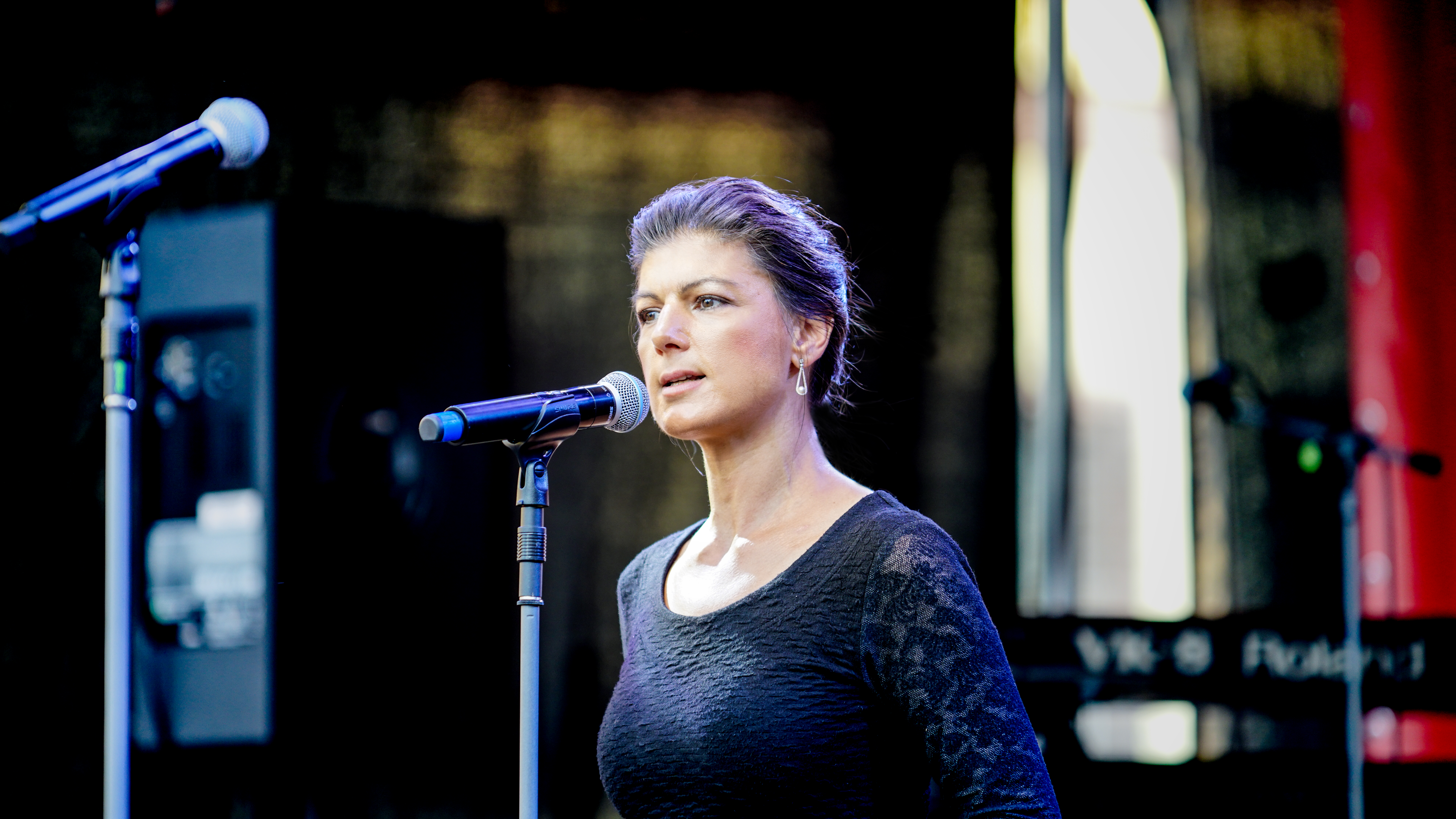
Wagenknecht speaking at Leipzig in 2019

Wagenknecht was again nominated as the lead candidate on the party's North Rhine-Westphalia list in the 2021 federal election. She was re-elected, but described the results as a "bitter defeat" for her party.

=== Secession from Die Linke ===
Due to the growing conflicts within Die Linke, Wagenknecht considered forming her own party. There had been speculation since 2021 that her faction and other like-minded groups within Die Linke, such as the Socialist Left or the Karl Liebknecht circles, would break off to form a separate party. Policy-wise, the new party was expected to follow a left-nationalist strategy.

At the end of September 2023, people from Wagenknecht's circle founded the association "BSW – For Reason and Justice e. V.". According to the news magazine Der Spiegel, the abbreviation in the club's name stands for "Bündnis Sahra Wagenknecht" ("Sahra Wagenknecht Alliance"). The association was intended to serve as a precursor to a future party.

In mid-October, over 50 members of Die Linke submitted an application for Wagenknecht's exclusion from the party. The initiators said they wanted to prevent Sahra Wagenknecht from building a new party with the resources of Die Linke. "This is no longer acceptable," said Sofia Leonidakis, leader of Die Linke in the Bremen parliament. The ongoing speculation about the founding of a new party and the resulting breakup of Die Linke also put a strain on the election campaigns in Bavaria and Hesse. Die Linke failed to enter both state parliaments.

In January 2024, her new party was officially launched.

Wagenknecht was her party's candidate for chancellor in the 2025 federal election, running as the first candidate on the state list of the North Rhine-Westphalian BSW. Unlike the top candidates of all other parties represented in the Bundestag, however, she did not stand as a candidate in any constituency. Since the BSW will not be represented in the Bundestag, receiving 4.97% in the preliminary results and 4.98% in the final results, Sahra Wagenknecht will not remain a member of the Bundestag.

== Political positions ==
=== Economic policy ===
In the 1990s, according to her companion Gregor Gysi, Wagenknecht supported communist theses such as those of Walter Ulbricht, before she "discovered" Ludwig Erhard's positions for herself, according to Gysi. Wagenknecht herself described her idea of a new economic policy in her 2013 book Freedom instead of Capitalism as "creative socialism". By this she meant a "market economy without capitalism" and a "socialism without a planned economy" and distanced herself from communism. In fact, Wagenknecht referred to the pioneers of ordoliberalism, whose ideas are otherwise more commonly represented in the Free Democratic Party (FDP). In 2013, during the financial and the European debt crisis, Wagenknecht proposed a debt cut and certain subsequent measures to end the euro crisis, while at the same time generating economic growth and regulating the financial markets. Business journalist Christian Rickens called this "arch-liberal at its core". In 2013, Der Spiegel editor Hauke Janssen saw clear differences between the arguments of Wagenknecht and the ordoliberal theory, for example on the topics of wage increases and unemployment; in his view, Wagenknecht "wrongly" appropriated Ludwig Erhard.

Ahead of the launch of BSW in October 2023, Tagesschau noted that Wagenknecht's positions at that time emphasised "economic reason" and placed economic fundamentals before social welfare, comparing her stance to that of the conservative CDU and FDP. In an interview, she described her goals as combating inflation, encouraging small and medium enterprise and domestic technology development, and establishing stable trade with a wide range of partners. She had previously rejected accusations that she sought to establish control bodies for various industries and cited as inspiration the ideas of economist Mariana Mazzucato, who was also considered a source for Robert Habeck (economics minister in the Scholz cabinet, December 2021 – May 2025) whom Wagenknecht frequently criticised.

In 2013, Wagenknecht rejected a return to the socialism of East Germany. In her view, public services such as housing, education, health, water and energy supplies, banks and key industries should be provided by the public sector to overcome "the dictates of returns and share prices". In 2013, Wagenknecht also saw possibilities for a different economic order beyond capitalism.

On 14 February 2014, the German business and economics newspaper Handelsblatt put her on the cover of its weekend edition, wondering: "Are the Left better at understanding economics?" (Sind die Linken die besseren Wirtschaftsversteher?) The ambiguous headline made it unclear whether the question referred to left-wingers in general or to Wagenknecht's party, The Left, in particular. The newspaper had earlier interviewed her about her ideas about liberalism and socialism.

For a long time, until 2010, Wagenknecht belonged to the Anti-Capitalist Left and the Communist Platform within the Left Party, where she was also a member of the Federal Coordination Council. In 2000, Wagenknecht called for an overcoming of capitalist production relations. Wagenknecht showed understanding for the economic policies of the states of Cuba and Venezuela. In a 2006 press release, she stated that "the continued existence of the Cuban system represents a glimmer of hope for those in the so-called Third World who are the losers in a market- and profit-oriented globalized world." In 2008, she also defended the decision by Venezuelan President Hugo Chávez to nationalize the oil production facilities of the US company ExxonMobil. In 2007 Wagenknecht argued that the Left Party must pursue radical and anti-capitalist goals, thereby remaining distinct from the more moderate Social Democratic Party (SPD) and Green Party. She criticized the Left Party's participation in coalition governments, especially the Berlin state government (Senat Wowereit III), which made cuts to social spending and privatized some services.

In a 2024 interview, Wagenknecht claimed that she and the BSW were the "legitimate heirs of both ‘domesticated capitalism’ of post-war conservatism and the social-democratic progressivism, domestic as well as foreign, of the era of Brandt, Kreisky and Palme," and also stated that while she found Marx's views on capitalist crises and property relations very useful, she said not to believe in central planning or total nationalizations and seeing "third options" instead.

=== Foreign policy ===
In 2017, Wagenknecht called for the dissolution of NATO and for a new security agreement that links Germany and Russia. Throughout her career, Wagenknecht has argued in favor of a closer relationship with Russia. In 1992, she had published an essay praising Stalin-era Russia, a view she said in 2017 she no longer espoused.

Wagenknecht has expressed strong support for the rise of left-wing leaders in Latin America, such as Hugo Chávez, and for SYRIZA's 2015 electoral victory in Greece. She serves as a spokesperson for the Venezuela Avanza solidarity network, and was an alternate on the European Parliament's delegation for relations with Mercosur.

In 2010, she refused to join a standing ovation when former Israeli Prime Minister and Nobel Laureate Shimon Peres gave a speech in the Bundestag on Holocaust Remembrance Day.

==== Russia and Russian invasion of Ukraine ====
Before Russia's invasion of Ukraine, Wagenknecht was a prominent defender of Russia and its President Vladimir Putin, arguing that while the United States was trying to "conjure up" an invasion of Ukraine, "Russia has in fact no interest in marching into Ukraine". After Russia launched a large-scale invasion of Ukraine on 24 February 2022, Wagenknecht said that her judgment had been wrong. Wagenknecht opposed sanctions against Russia over the 2022 Russian invasion of Ukraine, and, in a speech in September 2022, accused the German government of "launching an unprecedented economic war against our most important energy supplier". Before the war, over half of Germany's gas was supplied by Russia. In May, The Left had voted in favor of economic sanctions against Russia. Her speech was applauded by The Left party leadership and by the far-right Alternative for Germany. Her speech prompted the resignation of two high-profile party members.

On 10 February 2023, Wagenknecht and Alice Schwarzer started collecting signatures for their Manifest für Frieden (lit. 'Manifesto for peace') on Change.org. It called for negotiations with Russia and a halt to arms deliveries to Ukraine. By the end of the month it had received 700,000 signatures. A rally for peace with Wagenknecht and Schwarzer on 25 February was also attended by far-right groups, and was said to have appealed to the Querfront.

On the death of Russian opposition politician Alexei Navalny in February 2024, Wagenknecht commented: "The early death of Alexei Navalny is shocking. Even if it is still unclear exactly what Putin's critic died of. One thing is certain: Navalny was a victim of the autocratic system in today's Russia."

In the spring of 2024, in two interviews, she linked the peace negotiations she had called for between Ukraine and Russia with the proposal that the population in Russian-occupied Ukrainian territories should vote on their nationality in a referendum supervised by the United Nations. She also outlined what a peace agreement could look like, and did not rule out security guarantees or a military obligation to provide Ukraine with military assistance if Russia were to break a peace agreement. She could imagine China, Turkey or France as guarantor powers. She also called for Gerhard Schröder's "line to the Russian president" to be used for negotiations. In June 2024 she defended the absence of the BSW MPs from a speech by Ukrainian President Volodymyr Zelenskyy in the Bundestag, she described the war in Ukraine as a "proxy war" between NATO and Russia.

In December 2024, Wagenknecht declared that she "condemns this war." She "considers politicians who start wars – and that also applies to Vladimir Putin – to be criminals."

==== Israel–Palestine conflict ====
Amidst the Gaza war, Wagenknecht described the Gaza Strip as an "open-air prison". In an August 2024 interview she stated "I will always defend Israel's right to exist. [Israel does have the right to defend itself against] Hamas and its terrible attack in October. But the campaign of destruction in the Gaza Strip has long ceased to be self-defence." She also stated that a ceasefire is needed.

=== Refugee policy ===
In response to the 2015 Cologne sexual attacks, Wagenknecht stated "Whoever abuses his right to hospitality has forfeited his right to hospitality". This statement was almost unanimously criticized in her party and parliamentary group colleagues, but did receive praise from some in the AfD.

On 28 May 2016, an activist from the anti-fascist group Torten für Menschenfeinde ("Cakes for Enemies of Humanity") pushed a chocolate cake into Wagenknecht's face at a Left Party meeting in Magdeburg in response to Wagenknecht's calls for limits on the number of refugees. Wagenknecht has criticized Angela Merkel's refugee policies, arguing that her government has not provided the levels of financial and infrastructural support required to avoid increasing pressure on local authorities and the labor market, thereby exacerbating tensions in society. She has also said that Merkel's policies were partly to blame for the 2016 Berlin truck attack.

Partly in response to these experiences, in 2021, she published the book Die Selbstgerechten ("The Self-Righteous") in which she criticizes left-liberals ("Linksliberale") for being neither left nor liberal but rather supporting the ruling classes, and, to some extent, their own interests. The book features, among several other topics, a discussion on immigration's alleged negative impacts on the domestic working class. It reached number one in the German non-fiction bestseller list as published by Der Spiegel.

=== Family policy ===
At the beginning of June 2015, Wagenknecht, together with 150 other celebrities from culture and politics, signed an open letter to the Chancellor calling for same-sex civil partnerships to be given equal treatment to opposite-sex marriage. In 2017, Wagenknecht advocated for legalization of same-sex marriage.

In 2024, Wagenknecht voted against a bill that would make it easier to change one's gender. When referencing said bill, Wagenknecht stated "your law turns parents and children into guinea pigs for an ideology that only benefits the pharmaceutical lobby".

=== COVID-19 pandemic ===
Regarding the COVID-19 pandemic, Wagenknecht has opined that only the elderly and vulnerable groups need to be vaccinated against the disease, and agitated against the German government response to the COVID-19 pandemic. Wagenknecht has opposed proposals for COVID-19 vaccine mandates, arguing they should be a personal choice.

Wagenknecht's positions have been compared to those of the far-right Alternative for Germany. In November 2021, Left Party colleagues such as Maximilian Becker, Martina Renner, and Niema Movassat suggested that Wagenknecht leave the party.

== Personal life ==
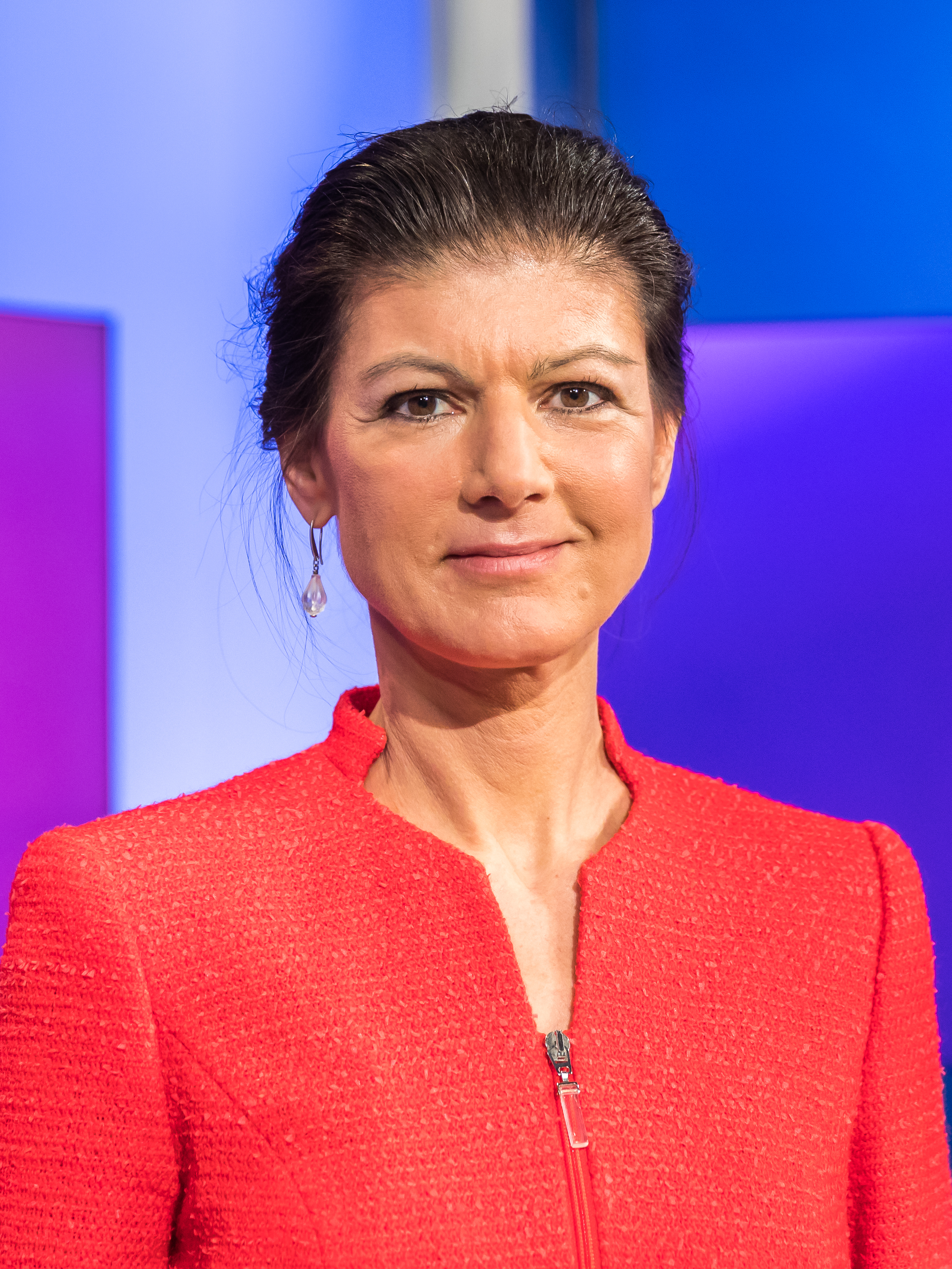
Wagenknecht in 2023

Wagenknecht married businessman Ralph-Thomas Niemeyer in May 1997. On 12 November 2011, politician Oskar Lafontaine stated publicly that he and Wagenknecht had become "close friends". At the time, Wagenknecht and Lafontaine had already separated from their respective spouses. Wagenknecht married Lafontaine, 26 years her senior, on 22 December 2014. She is an atheist.

In 2023, the media estimated Wagenknecht's assets at €3million. In addition to her parliamentary remuneration, Wagenknecht earned around €750000 in book and speaking fees in 2023. She was one of the highest earning German politicians in the Bundestag in her last tenure.

== Books ==
- Kapital, Crash, Krise… Kein Ausweg in Sicht? Fragen an Sahra Wagenknecht. ("Capital, crash, crisis… No way out in sight? Questions to Sahra Wagenknecht.") Pahl-Rugenstein, Bonn 1998, ISBN 3-89144-250-5.
- Die Mythen der Modernisierer. ("The myths of the modernizers.") Dingsda, Querfurt 2001, ISBN 3-928498-84-3.
- Kapitalismus im Koma: Eine sozialistische Diagnose. ("Capitalism in a coma: A socialist diagnosis.") Edition Ost, Berlin 2003, ISBN 3-360-01050-7.
- Wahnsinn mit Methode: Finanzkrise und Weltwirtschaft. ("Methodical madness: Financial crisis and global economy.") Das Neue Berlin, Berlin 2008, ISBN 978-3-360-01956-1.
- Freiheit statt Kapitalismus: Wie wir zu mehr Arbeit, Innovation und Gerechtigkeit kommen. ("Freedom instead of capitalism: How we will achieve more work, innovation, and justice.") Eichborn, Berlin 2011, ISBN 978-3-8218-6546-1.
  - Freiheit statt Kapitalismus: Über vergessene Ideale, die Eurokrise und unsere Zukunft. ("Freedom instead of capitalism: About forgotten ideals, the Euro crisis, and our future.") 2nd expanded edition, Campus, Frankfurt am Main 2012, ISBN 978-3-593-39731-3; ungekürzte Taschenbuchausgabe: dtv, München 2013, ISBN 978-3-423-34783-9.
- The Limits of Choice. Saving Decisions and Basic Needs in Developed Countries. Campus, Frankfurt am Main 2013, ISBN 978-3-593-39916-4. (Also doctoral dissertation at the Technische Universität Chemnitz in 2012.)
- Kapitalismus, was tun? Schriften zur Krise. ("Capitalism, what to do? Writings about the crisis.") Das Neue Berlin, Berlin 2013, ISBN 978-3-360-02159-5.}.
- Reichtum ohne Gier. Wie wir uns vor dem Kapitalismus retten. ("Prosperity Without Greed: How to Save Ourselves from Capitalism"), Campus-Verlag, Frankfurt am Main 2016, ISBN 978-3-5935-0516-9.
- Die Selbstgerechten: Mein Gegenprogramm – für Gemeinsinn und Zusammenhalt. ("The self-righteous: my counter-scheme – for public spirit and social cohesion."), Campus-Verlag, Frankfurt am Main 2021, ISBN 978-3-593-51390-4.
