= Integreat =

Mobile app

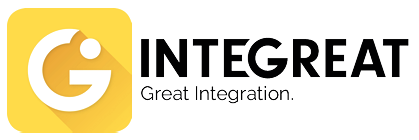
- Developer: Tür an Tür Digitalfabrik gGmbH
- Release: 2015
- Operating system: Android, iOS

Integreat (former project name: Refguide+) is an open source mobile app that provides local information and services tailored to refugees and migrants coming to Germany. The content is maintained by local organizations, such as local governments or integration officers, and made available in locally relevant languages.

It was developed by Tür an Tür - Digitalfabrik gGmbH (formerly Tür an Tür - Digital Factory gGmbH) in Augsburg together with a team of researchers and students from the Technical University of Munich.

== History ==
In 1997, the Augsburg association "Tür an Tür", which has been working for refugees since 1992, published the brochure "First Steps", which answers local everyday questions. Since addresses and contact persons change quickly, some information is already outdated after a few weeks. Students of business informatics at the Technical University of Munich therefore developed the app Integreat within eight months together with the association and the social department of the city of Augsburg. The app was then also used by other cities and districts within months. As of February 3, 2022, information was available at 72 locations, including Munich, Dortmund, Nuremberg and Augsburg.

== Mode of action ==
Refugees need information on areas such as registration, contact persons, health care, education, family, work and everyday life. Integreat seeks to provide refugees with this information by allowing them to select their geographic location and receive locally relevant information. This information is available offline once the app is opened so it can be used without an internet connection. In addition, the content is translated into the native languages of refugees and migrants to facilitate access. The content is licensed with a CC BY 4.0 license to facilitate collaboration and translation between content creators and dissemination of the content.

Integreat is now being used for a broader migrant audience and says it can also support professionals, volunteers, and counseling centers.

== Comparable mobile apps ==
Other mobile apps that are likewise intended to provide initial orientation for refugees include the app Ankommen, a joint project of the Federal Office for Migration and Refugees the Goethe-Institut, the Federal Employment Agency and the Bavarian Broadcasting Corporation, which is intended as a companion for the first few weeks in Germany, and the Welcome App, a company-sponsored non-profit initiative for information about Germany and asylum procedures with a regional focus, and a book by the Konrad Adenauer Foundation (KAS) and Verlag Herder with a corresponding app Deutschland - Erste Informationen für Flüchtlinge (Germany - First Information for Refugees) as a companion for Arabic-speaking refugees in Germany.
