= Federal Office for Labour =

Federal Office for Labour may refer to:

== Germany ==
- Bundesagentur für Arbeit

== United States ==
- United States Department of Labor
