= Frank-Jürgen Weise =

German officer and manager (born 1951)

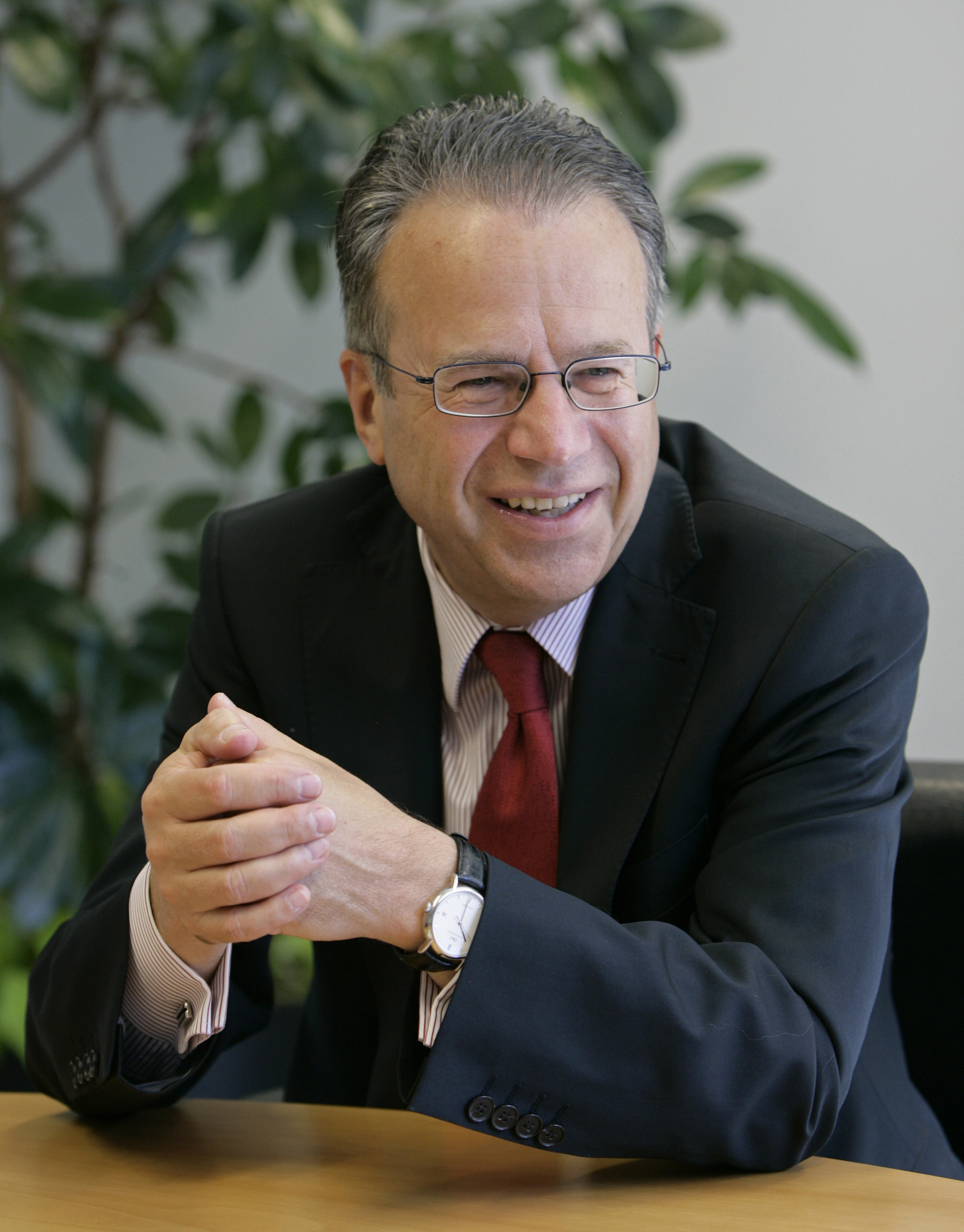
Frank-Jürgen Weise, 2010

Frank-Jürgen Weise (born 8 October 1951 in Radebeul, East Germany) is a German officer (Oberst of the reserve) and manager.

== Career ==
From 2004 until 2017, Weise served as CEO of the Bundesagentur für Arbeit, the German Federal Agency for Employment. In addition, in 2010, he chaired the ad-hoc Bundeswehr Structural Commission. From 2015, Weise also headed the Federal Office for Migration and Refugees.

From 2014 to 2024, Weise served as Chairman of the Board of the Hertie Foundation.

In 2024, Weise and Bodo Ramelow served as unpaid arbitrators for negotiations between German airline Lufthansa and the United Services Trade Union (ver.di).

In 2025, the government of Chancellor Friedrich Merz appointed Weise as co-chair – alongside Constanze Janda – of an expert commission tasked with developing recommendations for a comprehensive reorganization of Germany’s pension system.

== Other activities ==
=== Corporate boards ===
- Rantum Capital, Partner

=== Non-profit organizations ===
- IZA Institute of Labor Economics, Member of the Scientific Council (since 2017)
- Deutsche Post Stiftung, Member of the Scientific Council
- Goethe University Frankfurt, Member of the Board of Trustees
- Hertie School of Governance, Member of the Supervisory Board
- Jugend debattiert, Chairman of the Board of Trustees
- Federal Academy for Security Policy (BAKS), Member of the Advisory Board (since 2012)
- Deutsche Nationalstiftung, Member of the Senate
- Order of Saint John (Bailiwick of Brandenburg), Member
- Petersburger Dialog, Member
- German Association for People Management (DGFP), Former Member of the Board

== Personal life ==
Weise is married and has two children. He is a member of the Christian Democratic Union of Germany (CDU).

== Publications ==
- Steuerfibel für Soldaten. Anleitung zum Lohnsteuerjahresausgleich 1980. Anleitung zur Einkommensteuererklärung. Pahl & Ardelt, Haibach 1980.
- Dienstzeitende. Was ist zu tun. Pahl & Ardelt, Langen 1982.
- Steuerfibel für Polizeibeamte. Schutzpolizei, Kriminalpolizei, Bundesgrenzschutz. Anleitung zum Lohnsteuerjahresausgleich. Anleitung zur Einkommen-Steuererklärung. Pahl & Ardelt, Haibach 1983.
- Einführen von Logistik. Eine spannende Anleitung zum programmierten Erfolg. Schäffer-Poeschel, Stuttgart 1993, ISBN 3-7910-0778-5.
- Bericht der Strukturkommission der Bundeswehr Oktober 2010. Vom Einsatz her Denken, Konzentration, Flexibilitär, Effizienz. (Report of the Structural Commission of the Bundeswehr October 2010) (PDF)
