= Maximilian Becker =

German politician

- Occupation: Politician

Maximilian Becker is a German economist and politician who is a member of Die Linke (The Left).

== Education ==
Maximilian Becker studied business, economics and corporate law.

== Politics ==
Maximilian Becker was member of the board of The Left Saxony.

The former parliamentary group leader of the Left, Sahra Wagenknecht, spoke again and again in 2021 of the "pandemic of the vaccinated". From the point of view of many party members, she took over the positions of the radical right-wing AfD. In November 2021, Becker suggested to Wagenknecht to leave the Left and join the AfD, writing on Twitter: “Well, I think that if a person represents exactly the same positions as the AfD, they should join the party and turn their backs on the left. It is enough!".

== Personal life ==
Becker is living in Leipzig.

== Publications ==
- Maximilan Becker, Mathilda Reinecke (2018): Von der Krise der kapitalistischen Wachstumsgesellschaft und Ansätzen einer Transformation. oekom verlag München, 2018 ISBN 978-3-96238-031-1
