= Sahra Wagenknecht: Die Biografie =

2019 book by Christian Schneider

- Author: Christian Schneider
- Language: German
- Subject: Sahra Wagenknecht
- Genre: biography
- Publisher: Campus-Verlag
- Publication date: 12 September 2019
- Publication place: Germany
- Pages: 272
- ISBN: 9783593509860

Sahra Wagenknecht: Die Biografie is a biography of the German left-wing politician Sahra Wagenknecht. It was written by Christian Schneider and published by Campus-Verlag on 12 September 2019. The book focuses on Wagenknecht as a person, including her estrangement from her Iranian father, her reading of Goethe, Hegel and Marx, and her marriage to Oskar Lafontaine.
