= Sandra Kaudelka =

German film director

Sandra Kaudelka (born in 1977) is a German documentary film director.

== Life and work ==
Sandra Kaudelka was born in Leipzig in 1977. She grew up in East Germany, where she attended a sports school, and moved to Berlin after the German reunification. She was trained as a production assistant at Deutsche Welle TV, studied film and theatre at the Humboldt University of Berlin and graduated from the directing programme at the Deutsche Film- und Fernsehakademie Berlin in 2013.

Her graduation film, I Will Not Lose, was shown at the 63rd Berlin International Film Festival. It is a documentary that profiles four former athletes from East Germany and covers issues such as doping and sports as political propaganda. Her intention was to show a broad spectrum of what sport was like in East Germany, countering what she viewed as one-sided stories that prevailed in the West.

Kaudelka's film Wagenknecht (2020) is about the left-wing politician Sahra Wagenknecht. It follows Wagenknecht from 2017 to 2019, covering the 2017 German federal election, the start of Wagenknecht's movement Aufstehen in 2018 and Wagenknecht's withdrawal from the position as The Left's leader in the Bundestag in the spring of 2019.
