= Shervin Haghsheno =

German politician and academic

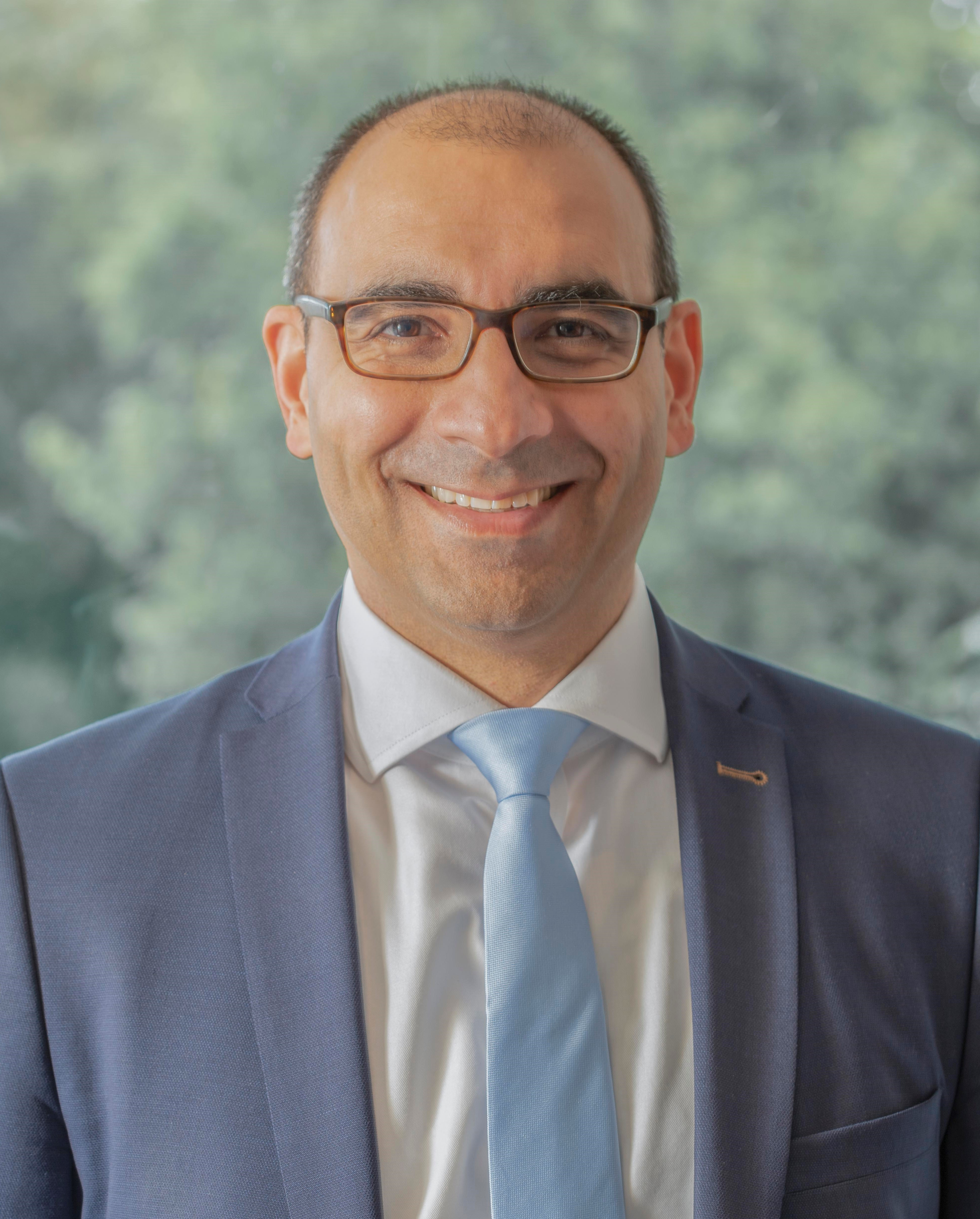
- Haghsheno in 2020

Deputy Leader of the Sahra Wagenknecht Alliance
- Incumbent
- Assumed office 8 January 2024
- Leader: Sahra Wagenknecht
- Preceded by: Position established

Personal details
- Born: 1975 (age 50–51) Tehran, Iran
- Citizenship: Germany; Iran
- Party: BSW (2023–present)
- Other political affiliations: CDU (1998–2023)
- Education: Technische Universität Darmstadt; University of Hagen
- Occupation: Civil engineer • Economist • Politician

Shervin Haghsheno (born 1975) is a German civil engineer, economist and politician from the Sahra Wagenknecht Alliance (BSW). He is a university professor at the Karlsruhe Institute of Technology (KIT) and heads the Institute for Technology and Management in Construction as Managing Director. Since January 2024 he has been deputy chairman of the party Alliance Sahra Wagenknecht - Reason and Justice.

== Life ==
Shervin Haghsheno was born in Tehran in 1975 and has lived in Germany since 1985.

After graduating from the Augustinerschule Friedberg high school, he began studying civil engineering at the Technical University of Darmstadt in 1994, graduating with a degree in engineering in 1999. He then worked as a research assistant at the Institute for Construction Management at the Technical University of Darmstadt until 2004. At the same time, he studied economics at the University of Hagen, graduating with a degree in business administration in 2004. He also completed his doctorate in the same year.

In 2004, he began working in the business world at the construction group Bilfinger SE. He worked as a management assistant at the company headquarters until 2005. He then moved to the building construction division. From 2005 to 2007, he took on project management tasks at the Frankfurt am Main branch of Bilfinger Hochbau GmbH, where he became a member of the branch management in 2007. In 2008, he was appointed to the management of Bilfinger Hochbau GmbH and held this position until 2013.

In 2013, he was appointed university professor at the Karlsruhe Institute of Technology (KIT). There, he is Managing Director of the Institute for Technology and Management in Construction and heads the Department of Construction Operations and Construction Process Management.

From 2013 to 2015, he completed part-time training as a mediator.

== Research ==
Shervin Haghsheno conducts research in the areas of project management in the construction and real estate industry, construction process management, cooperative project management models, lean construction, digitalization in construction and conflict management in the construction and real estate industry. He has published widely on these topics. Since 2018 he has been Vice Dean of the KIT Faculty of Civil Engineering, Geosciences and Environmental Sciences.

In addition, Shervin Haghsheno is involved in various professional associations and committees. In 2014, he was a founding member of the German Lean Construction Institute - GLCI eV and has been chairman of the board of the GLCI since then. From 2016 to 2021 he was a member of the board of the MKBauImm association - Mediation and Conflict Management in the Construction and Real Estate Industry eV. From 2017 he was chairman of the association. Since 2020 he has been a member of the management and advisory board of the IPA Center - Competence Center for Integrated Project Management. He has also been a member of the executive committee of the iddiw Institute of the German Real Estate Industry eV since 2016. He has also been a member of the editorial board of the specialist journal Bauingenieur since 2016.

== Politics ==
According to a Spiegel report, Haghsheno has voted for the Christian Democratic Union of Germany (CDU) since his naturalization 25 years ago. In the summer of 2023, he first contacted Sahra Wagenknecht and offered his support. Since 8 January 2024, he has been deputy party leader of the Sahra Wagenknecht Alliance. He positions himself for this party, particularly in economic policy.
