= Communist Platform (Germany) =

Association of the German Left Party

- Abbreviation: KPF
- Membership (2008): 961
- Ideology: Communism; Marxism
- Political position: Far-left
- National affiliation: The Left; German Communist Party (external cooperation)

The Communist Platform (German: Kommunistische Plattform, KPF) is an association within the German Left Party. Among the main goals of the KPF are the preservation and advancement of Marxist thought, improving the situation of the poor, and fighting racism and anticommunism. They believe that change in society should be aimed at building a socialist society. Its most prominent member was Sahra Wagenknecht, who was a member of the European Parliament and of the Bundestag. As of May 2008 the Platform had around 961 members.

In 2001 the association objected to a declaration made by the PDS, distancing itself from the building of the Berlin Wall.

Beside the activities within the party, the KPF cooperates with the German Communist Party (DKP).
