= Wir schaffen das =

2015 phrase by German chancellor Angela Merkel

I say quite simply: Germany is a strong country. The attitude with which we approach these things has to be: We have done so much - we can do this! We can do this, and where something stands in our way, it must be overcome, it must be worked on. The federal government will do everything in its power - together with the states, together with the municipalities - to achieve exactly that.

— Angela Merkel

"Wir schaffen das" (English: "we can manage this"; "we can handle this"; or "we can do this") is a statement made by Angela Merkel, the then-Chancellor of Germany, during the 2015 European migrant crisis. It has been described as a core slogan of the German concept of Willkommenskultur. She repeated the statement several times at the 2015 Christian Democratic Union party conference. The phrase has become a symbol of Merkel's refugee policy used by supporters and detractors alike.

Merkel made her original comment at a federal press conference held on 31 August 2015 following a visit to a refugee camp in Dresden where opponents of her refugee policy had booed and heckled her. The full sentence used ("wir haben so vieles geschafft — wir schaffen das") can be translated as "we have managed so many things — we will also manage this situation".

Individual media sources have suggested that Chancellor Merkel repeated the phrase several times even in situations in which the phrase could have been construed as insensitive to those injured or killed in acts of violent crime, or as dismissive of the crimes themselves, such as in 2016, in response to incidents in Germany, including the 2016 Munich shooting, the 2016 Ansbach bombing, and the 2016 Würzburg train attack. The repeated use of the phrase in response to criminal events is not corroborated by the legacy media domestically nor internationally. In September 2016, Merkel stated she would no longer use the phrase, telling the German magazine Wirtschaftswoche "I sometimes think this phrase was a little overstated, that too much store was set by it — to the extent that I'd prefer not to repeat it".

== Use of the phrase ==
=== Use before Angela Merkel ===
On 22 August 2015 Sigmar Gabriel, the then-Chairman of the Social Democratic Party and Vice-Chancellor of Germany had used "wir schaffen das" to refer to the coalition government's refugee policy. Gabriel's full sentence was "peace, humanity, solidary, justice: these are among our European values. Now we have to prove it. I'm sure we can do it".

=== Use by Angela Merkel ===
On 31 August 2015, Merkel said "I say quite simply: Germany is a strong country. The motive with which we approach these things must be: We have achieved so much – we can do it! We can do it, and where something stands in our way, it has to be overcome, it has to be worked on. The federal government will do everything in its power - together with the states, together with the municipalities - to enforce exactly that". She repeated the phrase on her New Year's address on 31 December 2015, saying "we can do it, because Germany is a strong country".

After terrorist incidents in Würzburg and Ansbach in July 2016 that were believed to have been carried about by Islamists, Merkel interrupted her summer holiday to speak at a press conference in which she presented a nine point plan to ensure greater security against terrorist attacks. She repeated the phrase "wir schaffen das" and added references to the changed political situation in the world due to the effects of globalisation.

=== Subsequent use by others ===
"Wir schaffen das" was subsequently picked up by the German media as a positive representation of the government's refugee policy. Writing in Der Spiegel, journalist George Diez wrote a column entitled "Ja, wir schaffen das" (English: "Yes, we can do it"). Holocaust survivor Ruth Klüger called it a "simple and heroic slogan" while speaking at a commemoration marking the Day of Remembrance of the Victims of National Socialism at the Bundestag. Journalists have also made amendments to the phrase; writing in Wiener Zeitung, Thomas Seifert in an editorial wrote "wir müssen das schaffen" (English: "we must do it").

In August 2016 Joachim Gauck, the then-President of Germany, said "I can't imagine a head of government standing before the people and saying "wir schaffen das nicht" [English: "we can't do it"]", confirming his support for Merkel. In December 2018 Ingo Kramer, the President of the Confederation of German Employers' Associations, said that Merkel had been correct when she said "wir schaffen das", citing the fact that 400,000 refugees had received employment or training since being in Germany.

Writing for Focus, Martina Fietz wrote that "wir schaffen das" would likely appear in any biographical material written about Merkel in the future, describing the phrase as representing "the most controversial decision of her chancellorship".

In November 2018 Annegret Kramp-Karrenbauer, the then-Secretary General of the Christian Democratic Union, used "wir schaffen das" several times during a CDU party conference, referring not to asylum seekers but to family policies. In August 2019 Boris Johnson, the then-Prime Minister of the United Kingdom, used "wir schaffen das" during a joint conference held with Merkel, in reference to Anglo-German discussions concerning Brexit.

== Merkel's distancing from the statement ==
In September 2016, shortly before the 2016 Berlin state election, Merkel distanced herself from the phrase in an interview with Wirtschaftswoche. She stated she understood German citizens' scepticism about the phrase, but explained "it is part of my political work, because I am convinced that we are a strong country that will come out of this phase stronger. It is an expression of an attitude that many people know... but sometimes I think that this sentence is a bit exaggerated, that too much is hidden in it. So much so that I would like to hardly repeat it, as it has become a kind of simple motto, almost an empty formula... of course, it was never meant that way".

The day after the Berlin state election, in which the CDU lost 5.7% of the vote, Merkel said "wir schaffen das" had turned into an "unproductive endless loop" and that it was insufficient to describe problems associated with the migrant crisis.

In early May 2025 Merkel was a speaker at the German Protestant Church Assembly, where she defended the statement and emphasized, that she didn't say "I can", but "We can".

== Criticism ==
"Wir schaffen das" was frequently used by critics of Merkel's refugee policy, often amending the phrase to "wir schaffen das nicht" (English: "we can't do it"). In September 2015 Horst Seehofer, the then-Minister-President of Bavaria, was quoted as saying "wir schaffen das nicht", criticising Merkel's sentiments and stating that he felt there was no way to "plug back in the bottle".

In September 2015, an editorial in Der Spiegel asked "can we do it?". In October 2015, then-Minister of the Interior Thomas de Maizière said "we can't do it easily - that's a big effort". De Maizière was not the only CDU politician to criticise Merkel's statement; Bundestag member Hans-Peter Uhl said "wir schaffen das so nicht" (English: "we can't do it that way"). Sharing similar sentiments, Finance Minister Wolfgang Schäuble said that unless fewer refugees were taken in, "sonst schaffen wir das nicht" (English: "otherwise we won't be able to do it"). Peter Tomaschko, from the CDU's Bavarian sister party the Christian Social Union, said "wir schaffen das nicht mehr" (English: "we can no longer do that"). That same month Alexander Gauland, the Brandenburg state chairman for the right-wing Alternative for Germany party coined the phrase "wir wollen das gar nicht schaffen" (English: "we don't want to do it") during a speech in Erfurt. There was also opposition in among left-wing parties; Boris Palmer, the mayor of Tübingen from Alliance 90/The Greens, repeated the phrase "we can't do it", and called on the government to place a limit on the number of refugees coming into Germany. Sigmar Gabriel from the opposition SPD said that "it is not enough to say "we can do it"", and accusing the CDU of making policies that was preventing Germany from being able to "do it" when it came to its refugee policies.

Some journalists also criticised the phrase and the motif behind it. Writing in Die Zeit in January 2016, Theo Sommer said that "wir schaffen das" was "no longer convincing". Mathias Müller von Blumencron wrote in Der Tagesspiegel in 2019 that Merkel had "divided" Germans when she said "wir schaffen das".

In June 2025 Merkel criticized attempts by the Merz cabinet to turn away migrants, who crossed other European Union states before entering Germany, as a mistake. She emphasized that everybodys asylum claim ought to be checked before eventually turning them away. Head of the Federal Chancellery Thorsten Frei commented that Merkels original "Wir schaffen das" statement was correct at the time, because governments need to remain assertive when facing challenges. Nonetheless, Frei concluded, that people who come from other, safe, European countries to Germany are not refugees and that migration today has to be reduced.

In August 2025 public broadcaster ARD produced a movie to commemorate the 10th anniversary of Merkels 2015 decision and her famous line. With only little screentime given to critics, well integrated former Syrians and well meaning experts dominated. Angela Merkel was given the opening and the closing sentence in the piece and journalist Marc Felix Serrao quipped, that even with the anti-migrant AfD being the strongest political party in the polls, the ARD's message was clear: Angela Merkel has nothing to reproach herself for. Serrao saw the hubris behind "Wir schaffen das" in the absence of a German migration policy and concluded that the nation had by 2025 become less safe and significantly poorer.

== Linguistic analysis ==
"Wir schaffen das" has been compared to "yes we can", a phrase made popular by former American president Barack Obama in 2008. Then-Chancellor Helmut Kohl made a similar statement in the 1990 referencing the reunification of Germany, albeit using the future tense.

Christian Lindner of the Free Democratic Party criticised Merkel's wording, saying it missed "what can we achieve?... How can we do it?... Who can do it?". Markus Feldenkirchen in Der Spiegel said the phrase alienated conservative German voters, stating the use of "wir" (English: "we") was "ineffective", asking "who are 'we' when all borders are open?".

Some journalists also commented on similarities with "wir schaffen das" and the German translation of the name of the left-wing Spanish political party Podemos (English: "we can").

== Public polling ==
=== 2017 ===
In September 2017, Die Welt published a poll which found that 55.8% of respondents felt that "wir schaffen das" as being "inaccurate" or "not applicable", whole 38% said it was "not true at all". 37.2% described it as being "rather accurate" or "completely accurate". It found voters from the CDU (56.5%) and Alliance 90/The Greens (68.5%) were most likely to say "wir schaffen das" was an accurate statement, while voters from the Left (47.3%), the SPD (51.7%), the FDP (58.2%), and the AfD (96.9%) were most likely to say it wasn't. In former East Germany, 63% felt "wir schaffen das" was not applicable, compared to 53.6% of respondents from former West Germany.

=== 2018 ===
In August 2018, the Süddeutsche Zeitung asked its readers their views on three years of "wir schaffen das". The editorial felt that many asylum applications had been successfully processed in accordance with the Convention Relating to the Status of Refugees, and that many refugees had been able to join the workforce. It also pointed out that many refugees in the 1990s from the Balkans had returned to their country once the Yugoslav Wars were over. It did accuse some German politicians of provoking "agitation" to create conflict.

According to a poll completed by ARD-Deutschlandtrend in September 2018, a majority of respondents felt that Merkel's refugee policy had not been a success. In addition, 49% of respondents felt that the government was not taking concerns around immigration seriously.

== Accuracy of claim ==
A study by the Institute of German Economy (IW) in September 2020 found that asylum seeker participation in the labour market has risen marginally, with the unemployment rate of people from the main source countries (during the 2015/2016 migrant crisis) falling from 89.4% unemployed in 2016 to 71% in 2020.

== Other uses ==
=== Merkel's 2018 Ash Wednesday speech ===
On 14 February 2018 during a speech commemorating Ash Wednesday in Demmin, Merkel said "ich bin überzeugt, wir schaffen das" (English: "I am convinced that we can do it"), in response to the slow formation of a new government. This was the first time Merkel had publicly used the phrase since 2016.

=== Beatrix von Storch's April 2018 tweets ===
Following the 2018 Münster attack, Beatrix von Storch, the deputy leader of the AfD's parliamentary group, posted on Twitter that the suspect had been an "imitator of Islamic terror". She had previously tweeted "wir schaffen das" with an angry face emoji. It was subsequently announced that the suspect of the Münster attack had not been a Muslim. Markus Blume, the general secretary of the CDU, called on von Storch to give up her Bundestag mandate. The leader of the AfD, Jörg Meuthen, also criticised von Storch's comments.

=== 2018 BAMF allusions ===
In June 2018, a scandal emerged pertaining to the Federal Office for Migration and Refugees (German: Bundesamt für Migration und Flüchtlinge, BAMF) allegedly accepting bribes to grant asylum applications. In a subsequent report by the Süddeutsche Zeitung, they used the headline "sie schaffen das nicht" (English: "you can't do this").

=== Merkel's 2021 COVID-19 speech ===
On 25 March 2021 concluding a speech about the ongoing COVID-19 pandemic, Merkel said "wir werden dieses Virus besiegen. Und deshalb bin ich ganz sicher, dass wir das schaffen werden" (English: "we will defeat this virus; and that's why I'm sure we'll make it").
