= Prosperity without Greed =

2016 book by Sahra Wagenknecht

- Author: Sahra Wagenknecht
- Original title: Reichtum ohne Gier
- Translator: Andreas Pickel
- Language: German
- Subject: Socialism
- Publisher: Campus-Verlag
- Publication date: 10 March 2016
- Publication place: Germany
- English publication date: 11 May 2017
- Pages: 292
- ISBN: 978-3-5935-0516-9

Prosperity without Greed: How to Save Ourselves from Capitalism (German: Reichtum ohne Gier. Wie wir uns vor dem Kapitalismus retten) is a 2016 book by the German politician Sahra Wagenknecht. The book blames capitalism for stifling innovation and not rewarding performance, and promotes small-scale economic structures as means for sustainability, competition and functioning markets.
