= Freiheit statt Kapitalismus =

2011 book by Sahra Wagenknecht

- Author: Sahra Wagenknecht
- Language: German
- Subject: economic interventionism
- Publisher: Eichborn Verlag
- Publication date: 2011
- Publication place: Germany
- Pages: 365
- ISBN: 9783821865461

Freiheit statt Kapitalismus. Wie wir zu mehr Arbeit, Innovation und Gerechtigkeit kommen (lit. 'Freedom instead of capitalism: How we will achieve more work, innovation, and justice') is a 2011 book by the German politician Sahra Wagenknecht.

== Summary ==
Sahra Wagenknecht criticises capitalism and promotes economic interventionism as a way to increase social welfare and avoid that the economy becomes controlled by unproductive self-interests. Wagenknecht calls the system she promotes "creative socialism" and defines it as "market economy without capitalism and socialism without a planned economy".

== Publication ==
The book was published in 2011 by Eichborn Verlag. A second expanded edition was published by Campus-Verlag on 30 April 2012 with the new subtitle Über vergessene Ideale, die Eurokrise und unsere Zukunft (lit. 'On forgotten ideals, the Euro crisis, and our future').
