= Innenministerkonferenz =

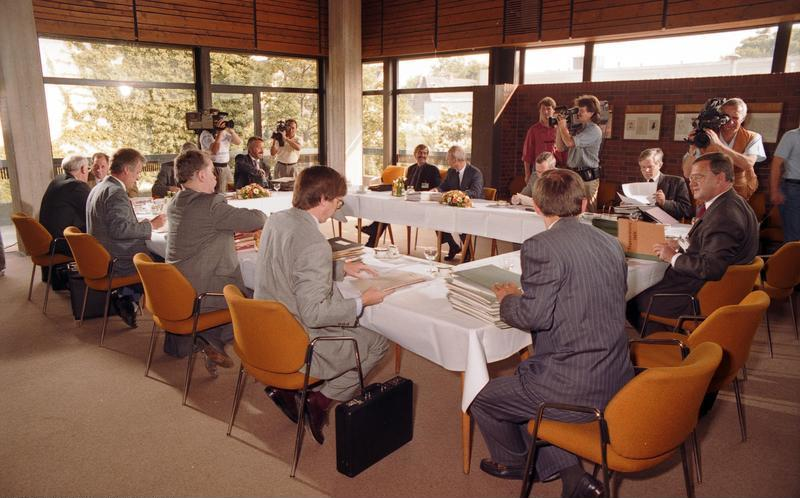
Conference of the Interior Ministers of the German States, Bonn, 1990

The Ständige Konferenz der Innenminister und -senatoren der Länder (Standing Conference of Interior Ministers and Senators of the States) or Innenministerkonferenz (Conference of Interior Ministers, abbr. IMK) is a regular conference on security and law enforcement issues in the Länder (states) of Germany. It is attended by all sixteen state Interior Ministers (in some states Interior Senators), with the Federal Minister of the Interior taking part as a guest. The chairmanship rotates on an annual basis. In 2026, the chair is Andy Grote (SPD), Interior Senator of Hamburg. The co-chairs are Eva Högl (SPD), Interior Senator of Bremen and René Wilke (Independent), Interior Minister of Brandenburg.

== History and procedures ==
The conference was founded in 1954 to establish a collaboration of the Interior Ministers of the German states on a political level, beyond the state and federal authorities.

Meetings are held usually twice a year. Special meetings can be held due to political developments or in emergency situations. Resolutions are adopted unanimously and can also be made in silence procedures. Since 2000, the decisions are public. There are six working groups (Arbeitskreis, AK):

- AK I - State Law and Administration (including Constitutional Law, Alien Law, Data Privacy, Administrative Law)
- AK II - Inner Security (including Active Defense, Defense against Terrorism, Police Issues)
- AK III - Municipal Issues
- AK IV - Protection of the Constitution
- AK V - Fire Fighting Issues, Rescue Services, Disaster Prevention and Civil Defense
- AK VI - Organisation, Public Service Law and Personnel

== See also ==
- Kultusministerkonferenz
