= Federal Office for Migration and Refugees =

Federal office

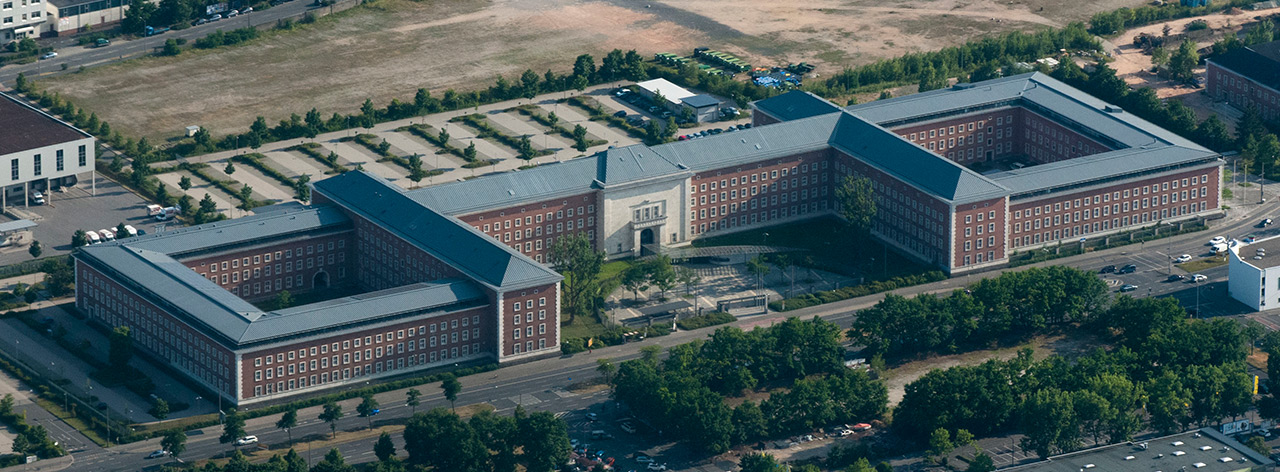
Aerial photography of the "Südkaserne" in Nuremberg, Germany

The Bundesamt für Migration und Flüchtlinge (Federal Office for Migration and Refugees, BAMF) is a German federal agency under the responsibility of the Federal Ministry of the Interior. It is located in the former Südkaserne (South Barracks) in Nuremberg. It is the central migration authority in Germany and is responsible for registration, integration and repatriation of migrants. It carries out asylum proceedings and makes decisions on asylum applications.

== History ==
The office was founded on 12 January 1953 as "Bundesdienststelle für die Anerkennung ausländischer Flüchtlinge" (Federal Office for the Recognition of Foreign Refugees) in Langwasser, Nuremberg.

On 18 September 2015, during the European migrant crisis, Frank-Jürgen Weise, president of the German employment office Bundesagentur für Arbeit (Federal Agency for Employment), was appointed also as chief of BAMF; since he was not allowed to have a further paid function, he served as a head of the agency without any additional payment. Officially, the vice president of the agency took over the tasks of the office head.

In 2017 BAMF reported that of the 340,000 migrants who participated in German language courses during 2016, less than half completed the course successfully. The authority could not confirm why this was the case, but cited factors such as illness and pregnancy to explain why some participants did not complete the course.

=== 2000–2018 alleged bribe scandal ===
The BAMF was alleged in 2018 to have accepted bribes for granting asylum and following these allegations 18,000 asylum approvals since 2000 were to be reviewed. The Bremen office was stripped of its authority to process applications and 13 other offices are being investigated on suspicion of irregularities. Preliminary results of the revision from March 2019 showed, that asylum-proceedings had been violated in 145 cases. Prosecutors assumed at that point, that a single administrator of the BAMF had collaborated with two private lawyers and arranged preferential treatment for the clients they reported to her. Love was cited as the likely motive.

In April of 2021, all allegations of violating migration law against the main defendant Ulrike B. were dropped, while two charges of an asylum lawyer having paid for Ulrike B.'s hotel expenses remained. On the 20th of April 2021 the proceedings against Ulrike B. were discontinued against the payment of a fine of 10.000,00 €. According to Carsten Momsen, professor of law at the Free University of Berlin, "political influencing" had been instrumental in creating the public perception of the investigations being an "incredibly extensive process". In 2026 the court Verwaltungsgericht Bremen found that Ulrike B. had mailed confidential information to the lawyer, received gifts and concluded she thereby destroyed the trust between her and her employer. She lost her status as civil servant and parts of her pension entitlements.

== Statistics ==
BAMF is in charge of the Central Register of Foreign Nationals (AZR). It is also the national data supplier for the Eurostat in the field of asylum statistics. BAMF publishes data updated on a monthly basis concerning developments in the asylum applications filed in Germany, on the ten countries of origin with the highest number of applicants arriving, as well as on the decisions made concerning the asylum applications, and statistical data on transfer requests that have been filed in the Dublin Procedure.

== Structure ==
Arrival centres

The arrival centres are the central entry point when it comes to the asylum procedure. It is in the arrival centres that all the steps are carried out under one roof which are necessary for the asylum procedure. This includes the medical examination by the Länder, the recording of the personal data and the identity check, the application, the interview and the BAMF decision on the asylum application, as well as the initial advice on access to the labour market by the local Employment Agency.

Branch offices/regional offices

It is in the branch offices that BAMF carries out the asylum procedure, with the filing of the application, the interview and the decision on more complex cases. Some branch offices, known as “regional offices”, offer a point of contact for the organisations operating integration activities, and are responsible for the integration work on the ground.

Decision-making centres

It is in the decision-making centres that the decision is taken on the asylum applications which are ready to be decided on of those applicants who have already been interviewed. This particularly relates to applications lodged by individuals from unsafe countries of origin such as Syria, Iraq and Eritrea. The decision-making centres thus take some of the strain from the arrival centres and branch offices.

== International cooperation ==
BAMF operates as Germany's national contact point for the European Asylum Support Office (EASO), the European Migration Network (EMN) and the Asylum Migration and Integration Fund (AMIF).

== Governance ==
=== Budget ===
BAMF is funded by the Federal Ministry of the Interior. In 2017, the agency had an annual budget of around 780 million euros.

=== Management ===
- Albert Maximilian Schmid (2000–2010)
- Manfred Schmidt (2010–2015)
- Frank-Jürgen Weise (2015–2016)
- Jutta Cordt (2017–2018)
- Hans-Eckard Sommer (2018-)

== See also ==
- Asylum in Germany
- Immigration to Germany
