= Sofia Leonidakis =

German politician (born 1984)

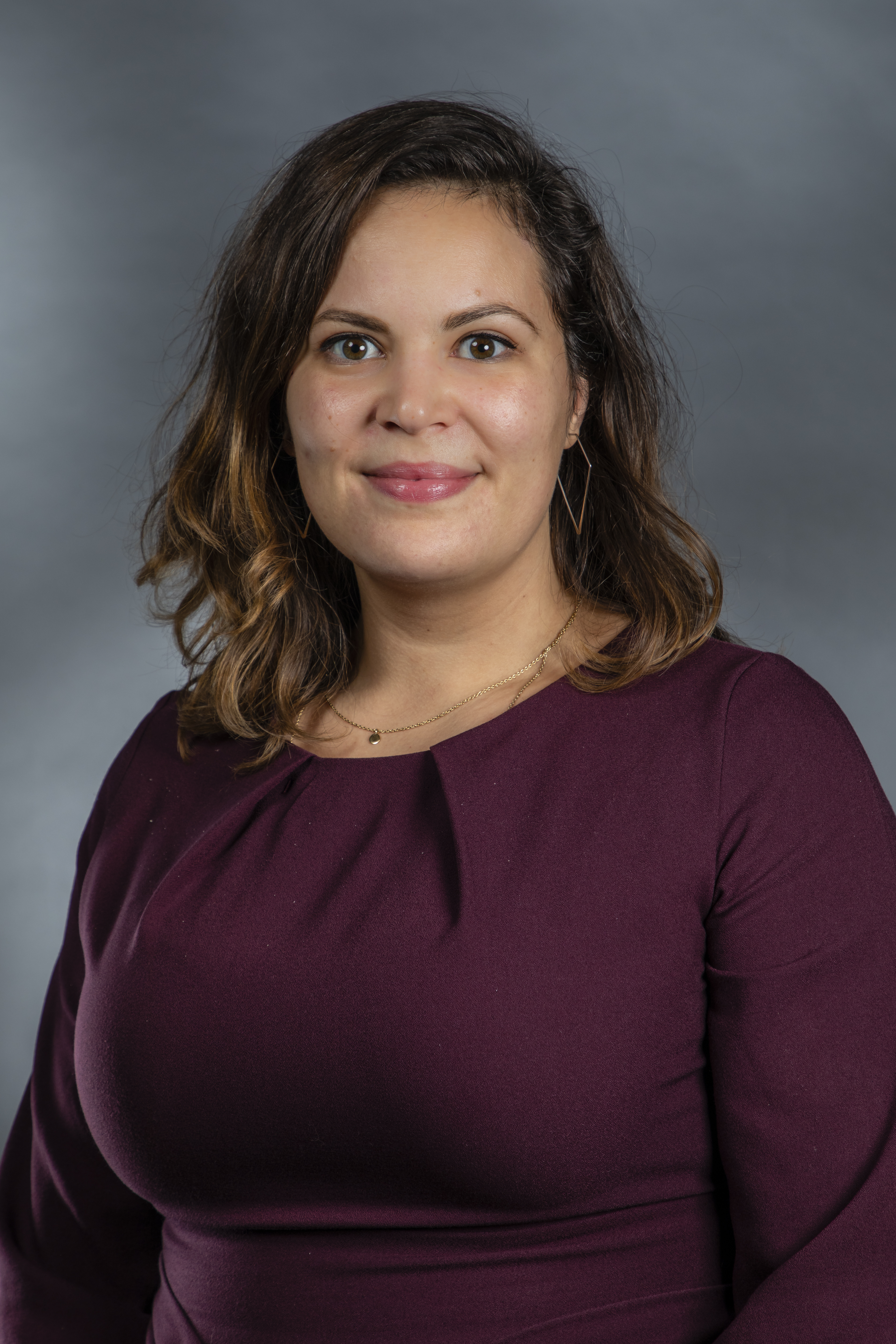
- Leonidakis in 2019

Member of the Bürgerschaft of Bremen
- Incumbent
- Assumed office 8 June 2015

Personal details
- Born: 27 April 1984 (age 42)
- Party: Die Linke (since 2010)

Sofia Leonidakis (born 27 April 1984) is a German politician serving as a member of the Bürgerschaft of Bremen since 2015. She has served as co-group leader of Die Linke since 2019.
