= Central Register of Foreign Nationals (Germany) =

The Central Register of Foreign Nationals (German: Ausländerzentralregister (AZR)) is a German database, containing personal information about approximately 26 million foreign nationals. Of these, as of February 2009, approximately 4.5 million are EU citizens.

The Central Register of Foreign Nationals provides data to over 7000 authorities and organizations, including police and customs authorities with over 80,000 users.

According to section 26 of the law governing the Central Foreigners Register, personal data stored about individual foreigners in Germany can also be passed to the authorities of foreign states.

== History ==
The predecessor of the Central Register of Foreign Nationals was the Ausländerzentralkartei which was established in 1938 by the Nazi government. In 1953 the Central Register of Foreign Nationals was established.

== Criticism ==
The Federal office responsible for administering the Central Register of Foreign Nationals was awarded a Big Brother Award for their operation of the database, for the given reason of "institutionalized official discrimination of non-German citizens in Germany".
