= Willkommenskultur =

German term

Three young women in Germany with a welcome banner for refugees entering the country in 2015

Willkommenskultur (German: [vɪlˈkɔmənskʊlˌtuːɐ̯], in German: Welcoming culture) is a German concept which designates firstly a positive attitude of politicians, businesses, educational institutions, sports clubs, civilians and institutions towards foreigners, including and often especially towards migrants. Secondly, the term expresses the wish that all foreigners and migrant people encountered by these institutions may be accepted and particularly not be exposed to discrimination. Thirdly, the word welcoming culture means all the measures promoted by a positive attitude towards foreigners and migrants in others.

The German word Willkommenskultur was voted Austria's "Word of the Year" in December 2015.

== Foreign perspectives ==
The Guardian distinguishes two meanings of the term welcoming culture:

Originally it was meant to attract people from abroad to Germany to compensate for a huge shortage of skilled workers, particularly in sparsely populated areas. Since the beginning of the European refugee crisis in 2015, the term was being used to promote assistance for millions of refugees coming to Germany, who were received by highly visible posters reading "refugees welcome", and by actual help of any kind, mainly on the private initiative of countless German citizens.

Translations of the word "welcome" are found at many places which are visited by tourists.

The French daily Libération adds that the word "welcome culture" was originally created decades ago in the tourism industry. According to this view "welcome culture" would also be a Germanisation of the technical term Hospitality Management.

The New York Times suggested that Chancellor Angela Merkel was also laying the foundation for new "hyphenated German" groups, namely "the Syrian-Germans, Iraqi-Germans, Afghan-Germans", alluding to the phenomenon of hyphenated American identities.

== See also ==
- 2015–2016 German migrant crisis
