= Bundesagentur für Arbeit =

German federal agency

Federal Employment Agency
- Bundesagentur für Arbeit

Agency overview
- Formed: July 16, 1927
- Jurisdiction: Federal Ministry of Labour and Social Affairs, Cabinet of Germany
- Headquarters: Nuremberg, Bavaria, Germany
- Employees: 113,000
- Annual budget: 42.6€ billion EUR (2023)
- Agency executive: Andrea Nahles, Secretary
- Website: www.arbeitsagentur.de/en

The Bundesagentur für Arbeit (often abbreviated as BA, Arbeitsagentur, or AA; German for 'Federal Employment Agency') is a German federal agency under the Federal Ministry for Labour and Social Affairs. Its headquarters are in Nuremberg. Its director is Andrea Nahles.

The BA manages job centres across Germany and administers unemployment benefits. The agency is further divided into Arbeitsagentur and Jobcenter.

== Organization ==
BA provides services for the labor market as a federal agency, including job placement, job advice and job promotion, administering German unemployment insurance, and regulating unemployment benefit. As a federal corporation under public law with self-administration, it is subject to legal supervision by the Federal Ministry of Labor and Social Affairs (Section 393 Para. 1 SGB III).

In a few areas, the ministry also has the right to issue instructions and carries out technical supervision, e.g. for unemployment statistics (Section 283 Para. 2 SGB III) and the employment of foreigners and immigrants (Section 288 Para. 2 SGB III).

As special departments of the Federal Employment Agency, family allowance offices are responsible for implementing child benefit and for calculating and paying child supplements in accordance with Section 6a of the BKGG.

BA employs around 113,000 (as of 2023) workers. 42,900 work in the joint facilities - Job Center, while 5,200 work in the family allowance office). The Federal Employment Agency is one of the largest authorities in Germany and one of the largest employers in the federal government. A separate collective agreement applies to the employees.

Their balance was expected to be 1.7 billion euros in 2023.

BA offices at regional level are called regional directorates, and at local level they are called employment agencies.
