= Immigration and crime in Germany =

Crimes against and by immigrants in Germany

Crimes may be committed both against and by immigrants in Germany. Crimes involving foreigners (German: Ausländerkriminalität) have been a longstanding theme in public debates in Germany. In November 2015, a report that was released by the Federal Criminal Police (BKA) stated that "While the number of refugees is rising very dynamically, the development of crime does not increase to the same extent." Interior Minister Thomas de Maizière (CDU) noted that "refugees are on average delinquent as little or as often as comparison groups of the local population." A 2018 statistical study by researchers at the University of Magdeburg using 2009-2015 data argued that, where analysis is restricted to crimes involving at least one German victim and one refugee suspect and crimes by immigrants against other immigrants are excluded, there is no relationship between the scale of refugee inflow and the crime rate. In 2018 the interior ministry under Horst Seehofer (CSU) published, for the first time, an analysis of the Federal Police Statistic (German: Polizeiliche Kriminalstatistik (PKS)), which includes all those who came via the asylum system to Germany. The report found that the immigrant group, which makes up about 2% of the overall population, contains 8.5% of all suspects, after violations against Germany's alien law are excluded.

== Availability and reliability of statistics ==
Several studies carried out since the 1990s have suggested that the collection of accurate and meaningful statistics makes it difficult to obtain an overall picture of the effect of immigration on crime in Germany. For example, second or third generation immigrants may be classified as "foreigners" whilst recent immigrants may be classified as German. Research also suggests that crimes are more likely to be reported, if the suspect is or appears to be a foreigner or immigrant. Because each of Germany's 16 states has its own police force, federal authorities do not routinely publish national statistics. These are compiled state by state and are sometimes released only after a parliamentary request.

== "Guest worker" era in the 1950s-1980s ==
The Ausländergesetz (Deutschland) (Foreigners Act) of 1965 attempted to control immigration to West Germany.

During the 1950s and 1960s, a group known as Gastarbeiter participated in an organised immigration programme to the former West Germany because of labour shortages in the country. The former East Germany also had labour shortages but their "guest worker" programme tended to encourage immigration from other socialist and communist countries. Although the German government did not plan the program as a permanent method of keeping the "guest workers", after unification and the reform of German Naturalization Laws of the 1990s, former "guest workers" increasingly became German citizens. The first generation of "guest workers" did not have an elevated crime rate, but studies carried out in the 1970s and 1980s suggested that second- and third-generation immigrants had higher crime rates than their German contemporaries who were not from an immigrant background.

A 1991 LMU Munich study covering the preceding two decades found that crime rates were higher among immigrants with a strongly different cultural background from Germans. Under the guest worker programme, Turks and Yugoslavs had far higher crime rates than Spaniards and Portuguese, while the highest crime rates were recorded among individuals from third world countries. For third world countries, the immigrants were first generation.

== Trends in criminal activity since the 1990s ==
Studies in the early 2000s tended to show little correlation between migrants and crime in Germany.

From the start of 2015 to the end of 2017, 1,356,600 asylum seekers were registered in total. According to a 2018 study by German criminologists, the crime rate of non-Germans between the ages of 16 and 30 is within the same range as that of Germans. In May 2016, U.S. fact-checker Politifact suggested that, as crimes by immigrants rose 79 percent in 2015 and the number of refugees in the country rose by 440 percent, the crime rate among refugees was lower than that among German natives.

In November 2015, a report by the Federal Criminal Police (BKA) stated that "While the number of refugees is rising very dynamically, the development of crime does not increase to the same extent." The report noted that refugees from Kosovo, Serbia and North Macedonia were overrepresented and Iraqis were underrepresented. It did not contain representation for refugees from North Africa.

From 2015 to 2016, the number of suspected crimes by refugees, asylum-seekers and illegal immigrants increased by 52.7% percent to 175,438. Approved refugees were not included in 2016 statistical figures. The figures showed that most of the suspected crimes were by repeat offenders, and that 1 percent of migrants accounted for 40 percent of total migrant crimes. According to police statistics, 31% of immigrant crime suspects were repeat offenders. From 2016 to 2017, the number of crimes committed by refugees, asylum-seekers and illegal immigrants in Germany decreased by 40 percent, which was mostly caused by significantly fewer violations of the alien law, because far fewer asylum seekers entered the country in this year.

The first comprehensive study of the social effects of the one million refugees going to Germany found that it caused "very small increases in crime in particular with respect to drug offenses and fare-dodging." A report released by the German Federal Office of Criminal Investigation in November 2015 found that over the period January–September 2015, the crime rate of refugees was the same as that of native Germans. According to Deutsche Welle, the report "concluded that the majority of crimes committed by refugees (67 percent) consisted of theft, robbery and fraud. Sex crimes made for less than 1 percent of all crimes committed by refugees, while homicide registered the smallest fraction at 0.1 percent." According to the conservative newspaper Die Welts description of the report, the most common crime committed by refugees was not paying fares on public transportation. According to Deutsche Welle's reporting in February 2016 of a report by the German Federal Office of Criminal Investigation, the number of crimes committed by refugees did not rise in proportion to the number of refugees between 2014 and 2015. According to Deutsche Welle, "between 2014 and 2015, the number of crimes committed by refugees increased by 79 percent. Over the same period, the number of refugees in Germany increased by 440 percent."

A 2015 study in the European Economic Review found that the immigration of more than 3 million people of German descent to Germany after the collapse of the Soviet Union led to a significant increase in crime. The effects were strongest in regions with high unemployment, high preexisting crime levels or large shares of foreigners.

The refugee crisis in Germany has increased to above “1.7 million” (Trines, 2019) refugees dating back to 2014. In the year 2014 alone, “…there were 6.1 million offenses recorded by the police” (Reality Check Team BBC News, 2018). The hate crimes committed by German residents alone has become such an issue in the state that there have been studies conducted to find factors that affect the number of these crimes against refugees. Out of the 3,335 attacks on refugees between 2016 and 2017, Karsten Mueller and Carlo Schwarz, researchers at the University of Warwick, noticed a trend with regard to the attacks (Taub & Fisher, 2018). “Towns where Facebook use was higher than average, like Altena, reliably experienced more attacks on refugees. That held true in virtually any sort of community — big city or small town; affluent or struggling; liberal haven or far-right stronghold — suggesting that the link applies universally” (Taub & Fisher, 2018). This information can give German officials an inkling as to where these attacks will occur. Towns like Altena may be a small sample size, but the researchers also found more information regarding attacks in Germany: “Wherever per-person Facebook use rose to one standard deviation above the national average, attacks on refugees increased by about 50 percent. (Taub & Fisher, 2018). These findings allude to the fact that Germans may be just as much at fault for the spike in crime rates since 2014 as the refugees are. Another study done by Yue Huang regarded migrant criminal action on Germans since 2015 and whether or not there was a correlation between the number of immigrants and crimes against Germans (Lindsay, 2019). “The answer to this research question, according to Huang, was fairly clear. ‘We did not find a systematic association between the number of refugees and the number of German victims, in crimes that were committed by refugees’” (Lindsay, 2019). The finding in this study shows that the spikes in crime are not fully attributed to refugees alone.

For several types of crime and drug crime in particular, it was reported that organised crime gangs were dominated by people from countries with high rates of immigration to Germany. In 2017, the most common nationality of foreign organized crime gangs was Albanian with 21 gangs, the great majority of which were active in drug trafficking. In 2017 there were 13 identified Serbian organized crime gangs, active in drug crime, property crime and violent crime. In 2017 there were 12 Kosovar gangs, active in property crime, drug trade and forgeries. Syrian gangs were active in drug trade and drug smuggling.

The Independent reported that in 2017 crime in Germany was at its lowest for 30 years, and that crimes by non-Germans had fallen by 23% to just over 700,000. At the same time, there was a significant increase in politically and racially motivated crime. Out of 462 right-wing offenders with outstanding warrants identified by Germany's Interior Ministry, 104 were wanted for crimes classified as violent and 106 were wanted for crimes classified as politically motivated.

In 2018, the Wall Street Journal analysed German crime statistics for crime suspects and found that the foreigners, overall 12.8% of the population, made up a disproportionate share of crime suspects (34.7%), see horizontal bar chart.

In 2018, the interior ministry's report "Criminality in the context of immigration" (German: Kriminalität im Kontext von Zuwanderung) for the first time summarized and singled out all people who entered Germany via the asylum system. The group called "immigrants" includes all asylum seekers, tolerated people, "unauthorized residents" and all those entitled to protection (subsidiary protected, contingent refugees and refugees under the Geneva Convention and asylum). The group represented roughly 2 percent of the German population by the end of 2017, and was suspected of committing 8.5 percent of crimes (violations of Germany's alien law are not included). The numbers suggest that the differences could at least to some extent have to do with the fact that the refugees are younger and more often male than the average German. The statistics show that the asylum-group is highly overrepresented for some types of crime. They account for 14.3 percent of all suspects in crimes against life (which include murder, manslaughter and involuntary manslaughter), 12.2 percent of sexual offences, 11.4 percent of thefts and 9.7 percent of body injuries The report also shows differences between the origin of migrants. Syrians are underrepresented as suspects, whereas citizens from most African countries, especially northern Africans are strongly overerrepresented. Afghans and Pakistanis are particularly overerrepresented in sexual offenses.

The 2019 "Criminality in the context of immigration" report showed an increase of 102% in the number of Germans who were victims of a crime committed by a member of the immigrants group (including all those who came via the asylum system to Germany) than vice versa. In the category "crimes against life" there were 230 cases where the victim is a German and a suspect belongs to the immigrant group; the number the 81 German victims of a terrorist attack, the 2016 Berlin truck attack, which were all counted as homicide or attempted homicide victims. The number of immigrants attacked by Germans in 2018 was recorded as 33. In the category "sexual offences", 3261 Germans were victims of crimes with an immigrant among the suspects, whilst 89 immigrants were victims of crimes with a German among the suspects.

The first quarter 2019 BKA report stated that no other group is as strongly overrepresented as crime suspects in Germany as asylum seekers, refugees and individuals without residency who cannot be deported (German: Geduldete). This group numbers about 1.6 million people and the great majority arrived in 2015 and later. They represent 2% of the population in Germany but 11% of suspects in cases of grievous bodily harm, 15% of suspects in cases of deadly violence and 12% of suspects in cases of rape and sexual assault. This was attributed by criminologists to the subgroup consisting of men aged 16–29 is disproportionately large at 34% of the total and that young males are overrepresented as criminals in all parts of the world, rather than to their ethnic origin. Also, the young male immigrants also have high unemployment, low education and experiences of violence, factors which are associated with higher crime rates also among Germans. Therefore, left-leaning criminologists like Professor Thomas Feltes at Bochum University argue that culture does not play a role. The BKA report shows that in the group, there are significant different among subgroups of different origin, where refugees from Afghanistan, Iraq and Syria are less overrepresented than migrants from North African states Morocco, Algeria and Tunisia along with sub-Saharan countries Gambia, Nigeria and Somalia. Criminologist Christian Pfeiffer attributes this to a "macho culture" in North Africa which carries with it an increased readiness to use violence. Academic Christian Walburg at Universität Münster attributes this to the North Africans having nearly no possibility of being given asylum and therefore have "less to lose".

=== Organised crime ===
Arab and Kurdish organized crime gangs have their roots in asylum seekers who began arriving in the 1980s. In the 1980s thousands of Arabs and Kurds from districts of Lebanon and Turkey, significant numbers of whom were stateless, sought asylum in Germany. Unlike the earlier guest workers, were allowed to work but instead received social benefits and often did not integrate into German society. Some of the arrived families instead relied on tribal and Islamic codes of justice. Groups of extended Arab and Kurdish families centered in Berlin are active in selling illegal drugs and running illegal prostitution, but have invested in legal businesses including real estate, fitness studios, gambling and restaurants. They exploit asylum seekers who arrived in the European migrant crisis of 2015–2016, employing them as streetcorner drug dealers.

In 2017, 16 Nigerian crime gangs were active in illegal immigration (German: Schleuserkriminalität) drug crime and other offenses in the night life scene.

In an opinion piece in the Sueddeutsche Zeitung in September 2018, the political scientist Ralph Ghadban argued that federal authorities had refused to recognise the specific problem of organized crime gangs based on family ties and ethnicity (Clan-Kriminalität), subsuming it under "organised crime" and that, encouraged by the success of the Arab clans, families from other ethnic groups, including Chechens, Albanians, and Kosovars were developing similar structures. According to Ghadban, these structures present a threat to liberal, individualised societies because they hinder integration. A modern society, he says, only functions when people voluntarily follow its rules, but clan members consider themselves members of a family rather than citizens of a country, and do not submit to the rule of law, regarding individuals who do so as weak and unprotected.

According to the Wall Street Journal, the ethnic crime clans represent both a security threat as well as an example of what can happen when integration of immigrants fails.

=== Honor killings ===
External videos
- Hatun Sürücü "honor" Killing in Germany

Investigating criminal records for partner homicides from the years 1996-2005 period, the BKA concluded that there were about 12 cases of honour killings in Germany per year, including cases involving collective family honor and individual male honour, out of an average about 700 annual homicides. An accompanied study of all homicides in Baden-Württemberg show that men from Turkey, Yugoslavia and Albania have a between three and five times overrepresentation for partner homicides, both honor and non-honour related. The causes for the higher rate were given as low education and social status of these groups along with cultural traditions of violence against women. 43% of the killings described in the study were against men. As of 2018, there are no current official statistics on honour killings in Germany.

=== Sexual offences ===
View chart definition.
Fraction of sexual offense cases with at least one immigrant suspect

Germany's Interior Minister, Thomas de Maizière, said that a 2015 report by the German Federal Office of Criminal Investigation (BKA) showed that "there is a higher absolute number of criminal cases only because of the increase in number of people living here with the arrival of the refugees". The report said that sex crimes constituted less than 1 percent of all crimes committed by refugees.

A 2016 report from the BKA showed that at least one asylum seeker was identified as a suspect in 3404 sexual offence cases reported in 2016, representing a proportion of 9.1% of the total; this was twice the proportion in the previous year. According to statistics collected by BKA, the number of asylum seekers suspected of sexual offences in Germany went up in absolute numbers in the 2012-2016 period, whereas the number of German perpetrators remained the same or fell.

In 2017, asylum seekers represented 2% of the population and 15.9% of suspects in rape and sexual assault cases. In that year, the proportion of asylum seekers (defined as "asylum applicants, quota or civil war refugees or irregular immigrants") relative to the total population had risen, while the number of asylum seekers as a percentage of sexual offence suspects had fallen slightly since 2016.

German crime statistics for 2019 suggest a rise in sexual offences.

By 2025, sexual offences were more than double they were in 2015.

==== Gang rape ====
After the gang rapes where immigrants were suspect in Freiburg, Munich and Velbert, an overview of police gang rape statistics in the 2010s was published by Tagesschau in 2018. The profile of the suspects and convicted fit that of sex crime in general as they were almost all male. Additionally foreign perpetrators were overrepresented compared to their share of the overall population in Germany. The absolute number of gang rapes were not increasing, but the proportion of foreign suspects rose and the proportion of Syrian, Afghan and Iraqi suspects rose. One reason cited for the increase was that these demographics have larger proportions of young males, which are inherently overrepresented for crime.

The number of assault gang rapes were significantly higher in periods prior to 2015 and the European migrant crisis, with the exception of 2016 where the New Year's Eve sexual assaults in Germany nearly doubled the number of cases. In 2017 there were 122 cases, the fewest since the German reunification in 1990. The sexual assaults in Cologne on New Year's Eve 2016 nevertheless ended the atmosphere of euphoria earlier in the year when hundreds of thousands of migrants had arrived in Germany.

=== Violent crime ===
In 2016, immigrant suspects constituted 14.9% of the suspects while representing 2% of the population.

==== Blade weapon crimes ====
According to the police union, the German government does not keep a record of knife and blade related crimes as a distinct type of crime. The German Police Trade Union (DPoIG) has highlighted the issue and has sought that individuals carrying a knife be prosecuted under attempted murder provisions in German law. The union urged the government to compile statistics nationwide on knife incidents, to establish whether the impression of an increase in knife crime and the involvement of younger immigrants was based on fact.

A series of prominent incidents led to a political discussion. Such incidents included some where an attacker murdered their partner (the 2017 Kandel stabbing attack, the Reutlingen knife attack, the murder of Mireille B, the 2018 Hamburg stabbing attack), as well as incidents such as the 2018 Burgwedel stabbing where a 17-year-old Syrian stabbed and injured a woman following a brawl between two youths in a supermarket, the 2018 Flensburg stabbing incident where a 24-year-old Eritrean refugee was shot and killed after stabbing a police woman with a kitchen knife, and the 2017 Siegaue rape case where a 31-year-old Ghanaian used a machete in an attack where a victim was raped.

=== Statistics ===
In German Federal Police Office (BKA) statistics on immigrant crime, "immigrant" include:

- Asylum seekers
- Migrants who are temporarily allowed to stay despite not having received refugee status
- Illegal immigrants
- Quota refugees

Suspects with approved asylum applications are not included.

According to the German Federal Office for Migration and Refugees people with an immigrant background (German: Migrationshintergrund) are those born without German citizenship, or born with at least one parent without citizenship.

== Violence against women ==
Women with a migration background (German: Migrationshintergrund) are, according to some studies, more often and more seriously affected by domestic violence from partners and have more difficulty extricating themselves from an abusive relationship.

=== Female genital mutilation ===
FGM has been criminal in Germany since June 2013. According to women's right organisation Terre des Femmes in 2014, there were 25,000 victims living in Germany and a further 2,500 are at risk of being mutilated. Perpetrators are migrant parents who take their children abroad, mostly during holidays, for the mutilation or bring foreign practitioners to Germany to mutilate several girls at once. In 2018, the estimate had increased to 65000. A further 15500 were at risk of having the mutilation done to them which represented an increase of 17% on the previous year.

According to the BMFSFJ most of the victims originated in Eritrea, Indonesia, Somalia, Egypt and Ethiopia. According to the BMFSFJ, of the 5969 women from Ethiopia living in Germany in May 2016 without German citizenship, 4417 (74%) were victims of female genital mutilation, of the 10462 women from Eritreans living in Germany in May 2016 without German citizenship, 8683 (83%) were victims of female genital mutilation, and of the 5797 women from Somalia living in Germany in May 2016 without German citizenship, 5681 (98%) were victims of female genital mutilation.

== Crimes against immigrants since the 1990s ==
The long history of Turkish immigration to Germany resulted in Turkish immigrant families becoming one of the largest ethnic minorities in Germany, estimated at between 2.5 and 4 million. Around a third of these still hold Turkish citizenship. On 27 October 1991, Mete Ekşi (de), a 19-year-old student from Kreuzberg, was attacked by three neo-Nazi German brothers. Ekşi's funeral in November 1991 was attended by 5,000 people. Aslı Bayram's father was murdered in 1994 by a neo-Nazi and Bayram herself was wounded in the attack.

The Rostock-Lichtenhagen riots took place from 22 to 24 August 1992 and were the worst mob attacks against migrants in post-war Germany, resulting in hundreds of arrests.

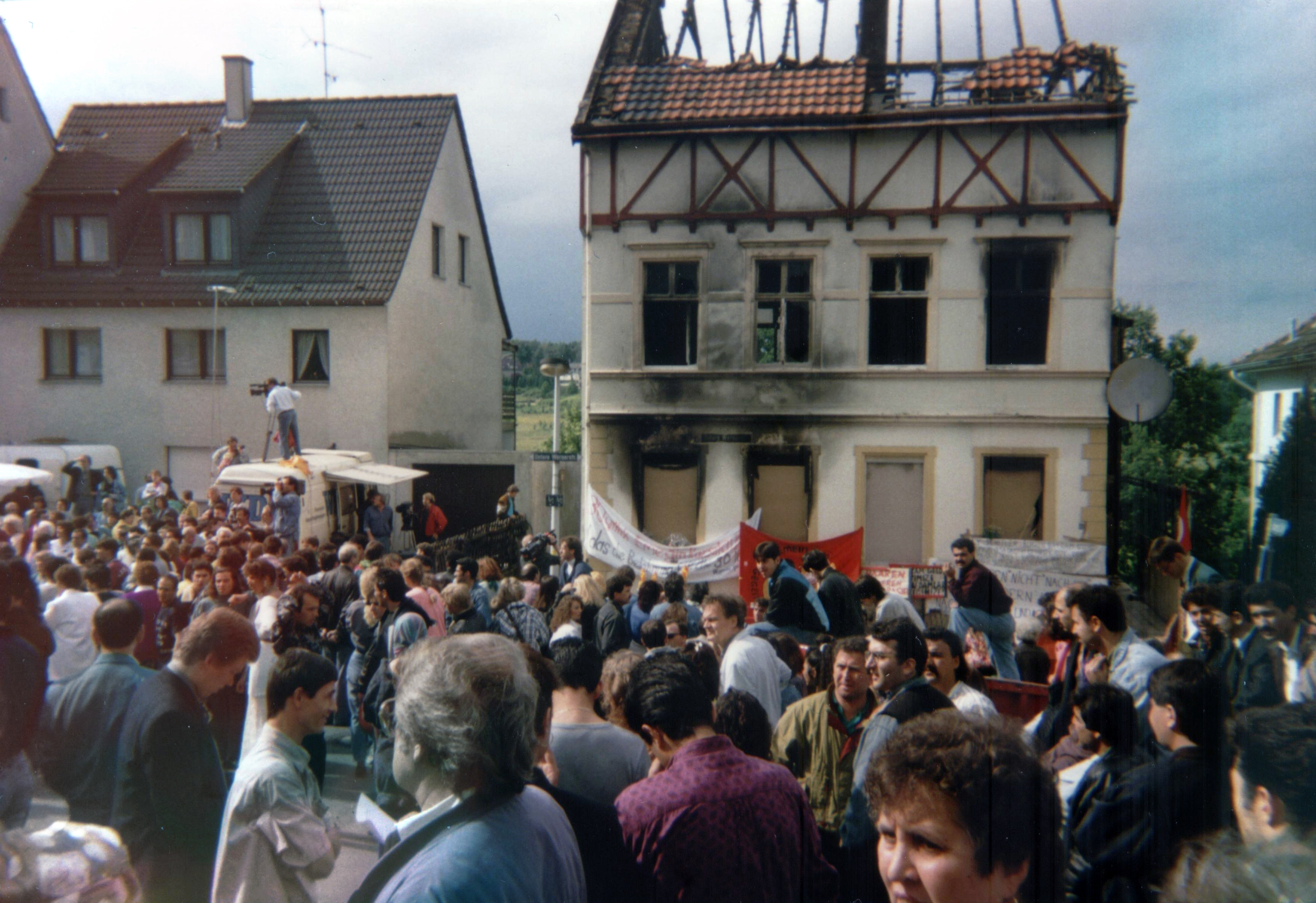
The 1993 Solingen arson attack resulted in five deaths and 14 injuries.

In 1993, an arson attack against a Turkish household in the town of Solingen in North Rhine-Westphalia caused the deaths of five people. Ahead of a commemorative event in 2018, 25 years after the event, Turkey's Foreign Office noted that "racism, xenophobia and Islamophobia are on the rise" in Germany and a representative of the family who were attacked called for reconciliation. A spokesman for anti-right demonstrators at the commemoration said, "When you look at how the mood was back then and how it is turning again now, I believe it's important to rally in the streets and to speak out against it."

According to a 2016 study, there were 1,645 instances of anti-refugee violence and social unrest in Germany during the years 2014 and 2015.

According to the German Federal Criminal Office, there were 797 attacks against residences of refugees or migrants from January to October 2016. 740 attacks had a right-wing background, which also couldn't be ruled out in 57 further cases. Of these, 320 cases of property damage were recorded, in 180 cases propaganda material was dispersed and in 137 cases violence was used. In addition, 61 incidents of arson as well as 10 violations of the Explosives Law, 4 of them in front of a residence of refugees, were registered. According to Der Tagesspiegel, there were also 11 cases of attempted murder or homicide. In 2015, there had been 1,029 attacks against refugee residences, following 199 in 2014. Germany's interior ministry stated that 560 people, including 43 children, had been injured in such attacks during 2016.

A 2017 study found that "the strength of right-wing parties in a district considerably boosts the probability of attacks on refugees in that area."

A 2018 paper by the Institute of Labor Economics found that xenophobic violence during the 1990s in Germany reduced the integration and well-being of immigrants. Another 2018 report, by the VBRG, a victim support group, showed an 8% increase in the number of violent far-right attacks in eastern Germany during the year, with a total of 1,200 such attacks having taken place in the regions of Berlin, Brandenburg, Saxony, Saxony-Anhalt and Thuringia.

A 2019 study linked increases in refugee migration to increases in right-wing hate crimes.

=== Vigilantism and anti-immigrant protests ===
Vigilantism against immigrants is considered to have become more widespread after the sexual assaults by migrants in Cologne and other German cities on New Year's Eve 2015. In January 2016 a mob attacked a group of Pakistanis in Cologne, and at Bautzen in February, an arson attack on a hostel for asylum seekers took place In February 2018, in Heilbronn, a 70-year-old man knifed three immigrants while drunk, in a protest "about the current refugee policy". A perceived increase in attacks on immigrants led to Chancellor Angela Merkel condemning anti-immigrant "vigilante" groups following the Chemnitz incident.

The Halle synagogue shooting was carried out by a lone German gunman, who claimed in headcam footage he posted online, that "the holocaust never happened...feminism is the cause of declining birth rates in the West which acts as a scapegoat for mass immigration, and the root of all these problems is the Jew."

== Political and social impact ==
Four violent crimes committed during the week of 18 July 2016, three of them by asylum seekers, created significant political pressure for changes in the Angela Merkel administration policy of welcoming refugees. The Wall Street Journal reported that two notorious crimes committed by asylum seekers in consecutive weeks in December 2016 had added fuel to debates on immigration and surveillance in Germany. The Siegaue rape case as well as the 2017 Kandel stabbing attack, in which a migrant who had been denied refugee status but who had not been deported killed his 16-year-old ex-girlfriend, intensified the discussion about admitting migrants.

The rape and murder of 14-year-old Susanna Feldmann in Wiesbaden in May 2018 sparked a debate on how the 20-year-old Kurdish Iraqi suspect and his family were able to leave the country using fake identities after the murder, as well as how he had been able to stay in Germany after his asylum application had been rejected.

Criminologists commenting on the situation in 2018 pointed out that the demographics of the migrants is an important factor: young males (of all origins) were responsible for half of all violent crimes in 2014, and young men made up 27% of all asylum-seekers who came in 2015. Dr Dominic Kudlacek, of the Criminological Research Unit of Lower Saxony lists other risk factors such as social deprivation, being alone, living in refugee camps with little privacy and spending most of their time with other people suffering from these risk factors which can add to the likelihood of committing crimes.

Criminologist Simon Cottee cites sociologist Stanley Cohen when he suggests that fear of immigrant crime among Germans is a form of moral panic to which societies are subject from time to time.

== See also ==
- Immigration to Germany
- Crime in Germany
- German refugee policy
- 2025 Munich car attack Afghan
- 2024 Magdeburg car attack Saudi
- 2016 Berlin truck attack Tunisian
- Immigration and crime
- Illegal immigration to the United States and crime
