= 2017 Siegaue rape case =

2017 rape case in Germany

On 2 April 2017, a young woman was raped by a stranger at the Siegaue nature reserve in the Rhein-Sieg-Kreis, in North Rhine-Westphalia, Germany. The case received a large amount of media coverage because of the perpetrator's status as an illegal immigrant and failed asylum seeker.

== Incident ==
On the night of 2 April 2017, the perpetrator cut his way into the camping tent of a young couple from southern Germany. He threatened them with a machete or "branch saw" and demanded their valuables. He then forced the 23-year-old woman out of the tent. While he raped her on a blanket in front of the tent, her 26-year-old boyfriend phoned the police from inside the tent.

The police searched for the perpetrator for several days, using a facial composite image and photos of objects associated with him. He was recognized a week later on the banks of the Rhine in the Beuel district of Bonn and arrested.

== Perpetrator ==
The perpetrator was a 31-year-old rejected asylum seeker from Ghana who, according to the German magazine Focus, had left his homeland after being accused of having killed his brother-in-law in an inheritance dispute a few years previously. He left his home country as he feared revenge from the victim's relatives.

In early 2017, the perpetrator first travelled to Italy, where authorities denied him residence. He then illegally entered Germany, where he was arrested on 9 February 2017 in Kassel, Hesse and then quartered in the central housing facility of North Rhine-Westphalia in Sankt Augustin. As Ghana is considered a safe country of origin, the Federal Office for Migration and Refugees rejected his asylum application on 23 March 2017. Until his arrest on 9 April, he lived in a refugee shelter in Sankt Augustin.

Following his arrest, he behaved aggressively and violently, causing the authorities to question his state of mind. Among other things, he set fire to his prison cell in the prison in Ossendorf, Cologne. When two staff members of the prison tried to extinguish the fire, he attacked the two guards, injuring one in the head. Whilst being transported to the prison, the offender had attacked a guard.

According to the forensic investigation, the perpetrator suffers from a grave personality disorder, especially narcissistic. Since the prosecutor's office affirmed the criminal responsibility of the perpetrator, he had to stand trial from the end of September 2017 at the Bonn district court for rape and predatory extortion. There was a positive DNA identification of the perpetrator's semen on the victim, although he maintained a claim of innocence. The forensic investigations, failing to perceive feeling of shame and remorse on the part of the perpetrator, predicted a high risk of relapse.

== Criticism of the police ==
After the contents of the emergency call made by the boyfriend became public, the behaviour of the police was criticised in the media. The boyfriend had told the female police officer who answered the emergency call that his girlfriend was being raped by a "black man with a machete". The officer asked if he was joking. After assuring him that action would be taken, the officer had hung up with the words "Thank you, bye", instead of keeping him on the line. He made a second call to the emergency number, whereupon the call was referred and police arrived after a 30-minute delay.

At the beginning of June 2017, it was announced that the two police staffers who failed to send assistance in response to the emergency call were being forced to leave their posts. The Bonn police had previously acknowledged that the "receiving female officer did not classify the circumstances of the first call correctly and her language was inappropriate".

== Controversy ==
The incident produced a discussion on social media about whether the response of the victim's boyfriend, who reported the attack to police but did not physically confront the blade weapon-wielding attacker, was ethically correct. According to the police, the boyfriend "did everything right"; it would have accomplished nothing if the student had intervened and he or his girlfriend could have been seriously injured by the machete-wielding assailant, said a spokesman for the authorities.

Psychologist Lydia Benecke publicly defended the victim's boyfriend against allegations, stating that it was probably the type of a "casual rapist" with antisocial personality disorder, a personality type with no sense of guilt and little impulse control. Perpetrators of this type usually use as much violence as is necessary to force the victim into sexual acts. If such perpetrators met with resistance, they would not shy away from drastic acts of violence or even homicides. To oppose such an offender could cause a fatal escalation of violence, which is why the behavior of the victim's boyfriend was the only correct thing in this situation.

== Legal proceedings ==
Legal proceedings began in September 2017 at the district court of Bonn. The defendant ignored the advice of his lawyer and denied the crime. When evidence was presented, including a positive DNA match, the defendant loudly protested, accused the court of using fabrications and insulted the victim as a "prostitute".

A psychiatric report found narcissistic personality traits of the defendant that were not pathological. Thus he was considered fully responsible for the crime. The court sentenced him to eleven and a half years' imprisonment in October 2017; the prosecutor had called for 13 years. The defence appealed the verdict.

In February 2018, the perpetrator was seriously injured in a fire in his prison cell, which the authorities believe he started himself.

After having processed the appeal by the perpetrator, the Federal Court of Justice (German: Bundesgerichtshof, BGH) confirmed the verdict of the Regional Court of Bonn on 6 June 2018, but declined the associated sentence, stating that the district court did not ascertain the full culpability of the offender without error. The case was referred back to the criminal court of the district court of Bonn to examine a possible diminished criminal liability and review the sentence.

== See also ==
- Immigration and crime in Germany
