= 2018 Freiburg gang rape =

Gang rape that occurred in Freiburg, Germany in 2018

- Native name: Gruppenvergewaltigung in Freiburg
- Date: 13 October 2018; 7 years ago
- Location: Freiburg im Breisgau, Baden-Württemberg, Germany
- Arrests: 9
- Suspects: 10

On 13 October 2018, an 18-year-old woman was raped outside a discotheque in Freiburg, Germany by a series of men. In July 2020, eight perpetrators were convicted of rape, while two additional men were convicted for not aiding the victim. The case drew public attention, due in part to the refugee status of most of the perpetrators.

== Incident ==
According to the police, on 13 October 2018, an 18-year-old woman was drugged in a discotheque in a remote industrial area along Hans-Bunte-Straße by a 22-year-old Syrian and then raped in front of the building by others, later identified as six more Syrians and one German; the accused were aged between 19 and 29. Police say that a man bought the woman—a student who was present with a female friend—a drink which apparently contained a tranquilizing substance, making her defenseless, and after going outside with her together, dragged the woman into nearby bushes and raped her, then left her there and returned to the club to call his friends.

The woman filed a complaint with the police the next day. Eight suspects were soon taken into custody.

== Investigation ==
Several suspects were identified from DNA traces found on the victim; further evaluation of traces from the victim and the scene was carried out. The police sought more suspects, using a 13-person investigation team. One witness claimed that up to 15 men had raped the woman.

Eight men were initially arrested for the crime, seven Syrians and one with German nationality. Three of the arrested had presented themselves on the Internet bearing firearms.

The main suspect was already targeted by an undercover investigation for violent crime and drug trafficking, and he was a suspect in another rape case. Police had planned to arrest him on 24 October.

DNA traces indicated there were two further unidentified suspects who were not among the arrested.

A ninth suspect, an 18-year-old man from Syria, was detained on 29 November in a refugee center in Freiburg, after traces of his DNA were found on the victim's clothing. He was in the discotheque on the night of the crime; police took a saliva sample from him. The ninth suspect had come to Germany via the politically debated family reunification provision. Police continued to search for a tenth suspect whose DNA was also found on the victim.

== Trial ==
The trial of eleven suspects began on 26 June 2019 at the Landgericht Freiburg.

On July 23, 2020, a German regional court convicted ten of the eleven suspects charged in the crime. The longest sentence was five and a half years, with the others given three to four years, and two who were convicted of not having assisted the victim were given suspended sentences. One suspect was found not guilty.

== Aftermath ==
Martin Horn, the mayor of Freiburg, stated: "There is no tolerance for despicable acts". He promised to bring the perpetrators to justice swiftly. Thomas Strobl (CDU), the Interior Minister of Baden-Württemberg said: "If the allegations prove true, we have to deal with a vile act that leaves no one cold." Officials called for calm, stating that "It is an act by individuals, which should not be generalized".

On Monday 29 October, a protest organised by the right-wing-populist party AfD/Junge Alternative was outnumbered by counter-protesters and the AfD event was re-routed as counter-protesters blocked their way. These tensions were similar to those in the aftermath of the murder of Maria Ladenburger by an Afghan migrant. The protest was attended by about 500 people, and the counter-protest was attended by about 1,500 people.

ZDF presenter Dunja Hayali demanded a "new and open debate" around the asylum and deportation laws because of the case. "That deportation procedures take so long that they cannot legally be implemented for 1,000 reasons and more is a situation that cannot continue", said Hayali, adding that her statement was not to be understood as xenophobic.

Boris Palmer (Alliance 90/The Greens), Tübingen's Lord Mayor, demanded that criminal refugees have their freedom of movement severely restricted, and proposed accommodating them in small asylum centres in remote areas without a connection to public transport. The current German laws would allow this according to Palmer ("Wohnsitzauflage", condition of fixed abode). A few days later, Winfried Kretschmann (Alliance 90/The Greens), the Minister President of Baden-Württemberg, also stated that he wants to keep refugees who commit crimes in groups away from major cities and distribute them in the country, saying the idea of sending some of them "into the pampas" was "not wrong", and "To put it bluntly, the most dangerous thing that human evolution has produced is hordes of young men."

CDU General Secretary Annegret Kramp-Karrenbauer said that after a deportation, criminals should be refused re-entry not only to Germany but also to the whole Schengen area for life, mentioning the gang rape in Freiburg.

The interior minister of Baden-Württemberg, Thomas Strobl, was called to the committee of the interior (German: Innenausschuss) of the Bundestag to explain why the main suspect had not been apprehended despite there being warrants for his arrest (German: Haftbefehle).

The two-week delay in the incident in Freiburg becoming public along with the delayed reporting of another gang rape case in Munich where asylum seekers were suspects started a debate as to whether the late reporting was deliberate. Criminologist Christian Pfeiffer said that such delays are not politically motivated but reflect the fact that group crimes take longer to process where a network of suspects is involved, and even longer when police are forced to use interpreters.

The victim suffers a post-traumatic stress disorder lasting at least until the verdict (as of 23 July 2020).

== See also ==
- Immigration and crime in Germany
