= Murder of Susanna Feldmann =

2018 crime in Germany

Susanna Feldmann
- Born: Susanna Maria Feldmann; 2 November 2003; Wiesbaden, Germany
- Died: 22 May 2018 (aged 14); Wiesbaden, Germany
- Cause of death: Strangulation

Susanna Maria Feldmann (born 2 November 2003) was a 14-year-old German Jewish girl who was raped and killed on the night of 22 May 2018 in Wiesbaden. Ali Bashar Ahmad Zebari, a 21-year-old asylum seeker from Iraqi Kurdistan, confessed to the murder and was found guilty in July 2019 at a trial in Landgericht Wiesbaden.

== Incident description and arrest of suspect ==
Susanna Feldmann was reported missing by her mother at 9 p.m. on 23 May 2018, after she had uncharacteristically not returned home for a morning appointment after a night out and telling her mother she was staying with friends. Shortly before being strangled to death, the victim texted a friend "Help me, I want to go and they won’t let me. They’re keeping me here." Her remains were found by police in early June buried near the Ländches Railway line, after they had been tipped off about the location by a 13-year-old migrant who lived in the same refugee station as Zebari. She was found to have been raped and then suffocated that night.

Feldmann's mother, Diana, had continued to receive WhatsApp messages from her daughter's phone after the time of her death. Diana said that the crime was not seen as anti-Semitic, because Susanna never mentioned her Jewishness, and her father was Turkish and mother originally from Russia, so she had both Turkish and Russian flags on her Instagram profile. Susanna had met a number of refugees in Wiesbaden, and had a crush on Ali's younger brother, KC, and Diana believes that she was tricked into the situation by KC in order to please his older brother and his gang. Diana Feldmann blames Germany's culture of welcoming immigrants (Willkommenskultur) and has asked that Merkel resign.

Ali Bashar Ahmad Zebari was born on 11 March 1997. He used his second given name as a surname when he arrived in Germany, so media initially reported his name as Ali B. or Ali Bashar. According to Stefan Müller, the head of police for western Hesse, Zebari had probably migrated to Germany in October 2015 as part of a wave of other migrants. Zebari lived in a refugee station in the Erbenheim district of Wiesbaden and was known to police authorities for other crimes involving violence. His asylum application had been rejected in 2016, but he was allowed to stay in Germany while his appeal was being reviewed. He was also one of several suspects in the sexual assault of an 11-year-old girl living in the same refugee shelter.

Zebari, along with his parents and five siblings, departed Germany on 2 June 2018 using false names. On 8 June 2018, he was captured in northern Iraq by Kurdish authorities. According to Tarik Ahmad, the police chief of Dohuk where the suspect was arrested, Zebari confessed to strangling Feldmann but denied raping her.

Dieter Romann, head of Germany's federal police force, traveled to Iraq and returned the suspect to Germany with the help of authorities in the Kurdistan Region. The central Iraqi government lodged a formal protest with Germany. In Germany, Romann was sued for illegally depriving the suspect of his liberty, but proceedings were stopped in January 2019 on the grounds that the extradition had been initiated by Iraqi authorities. Based on information provided by the Iraqi government, Prosecutor Oliver Kuhn said that the suspect was probably older than his German documents state. Die Welt reported that the age discrepancy arose because when the suspect and his family requested asylum in Germany in 2015, they claimed to have no identity documents; they later presented Iraqi documents at the consulate in Frankfurt. Because Zebari is 21 years old, older than the originally reported 20, he will be tried as an adult.

== Aftermath and public debate ==
The Central Council of Jews in Germany confirmed that the victim was a member of the Jewish community in Mainz and expressed condolences to friends and family of the victim.

This incident was one of a series of high-profile crimes by asylum seekers that led to a fraught political conversation about German migrant policy and hardened anti-immigration sentiments. The question of how Zebari had been allowed to remain in Germany after his asylum application was rejected in 2016 was raised. Politicians like Christian Lindner (FDP) raised questions as to how the suspect, along with his family, were able to leave Germany using fake identities. The Süddeutsche Zeitung noted that the murder of Feldmann was listed in social media among the cases of other German women killed by asylum seekers, and enumerated the murders of Maria Ladenburger of Freiburg (2016), Mia Valentin of Kandel (2017), and Mireille B. of Flensburg (2018); foreign media such as The New Yorker also grouped together the Mia Valentin and Daniel Hillig murders. Far-right parties and social media have also exploited the case for their own ends.

Ethnologist and head of the Research Centre of Global Islam at the Goethe University Frankfurt, Susanne Schröter, said that Zebari lacked respect for German society, German women, and German police, and spoke of a culture clash, whilst not making a blanket accusation against refugees, Arab men or Muslims. In an interview with web.de, she said that there were no young women in Germany for migrants like him. She suggested that Germany needed to develop a new approach for dealing with aggressive men shaped by patriarchal cultures. She said that the perpetrator had no respect for German society nor the police, and had viewed the girl as nothing but a sex object.

== Verdict and sentence ==
Bashar was found guilty of murder and rape in the court in Wiesbaden on 10 July 2019, and sentenced to life in prison. According to German law, the convict can be released on parole after 15 years, if a court finds that he is no longer dangerous. In this case the verdict includes a finding of "exceptional gravity of guilt", which means release after 15 years is nearly impossible.

== See also ==
- List of solved missing person cases (post-2000)
