= Murder of Sophia Lösche =

2018 murder case in Germany

Sophia Lösche, a 28-year-old female student and pro-migration activist who went missing while travelling from Leipzig to her hometown Amberg in the Upper Palatinate (German: Oberpfalz) where she never arrived.

Moroccan truck driver Boujemaa Lamrabat was sentenced to life in prison for her murder in September 2019.

== Timeline ==
On 14 June 2018, Lösche started her journey by train and wanted to travel the last few kilometres by hitchhiking. On the way she entered a lorry in Schkeuditz near the A9 Autobahn and she was murdered at a highway stop in Upper Franconia according to the police investigation and her body was carried 1600 km in the lorry through Europe to northern Spain.

Five days later on 19 June 2018, a Moroccan lorry driver was arrested south of Madrid.

On 22 June 2018, Spanish Prime Minister Pedro Sánchez offered condolences to the Lösche family and to Andrea Nahles, head of the Social Democratic Party of Germany (SPD) at that time.

On 29 June 2018, the German public prosecutor's office and police in Bayreuth announced that her remains had been found in Asparrena (Álava) in northern Spain and identified using DNA tracing.

During a church remembrance ceremony for Lösche in August 2018 organized by friends and family, the chairman of the council of the Evangelical Church in Germany, Bishop Heinrich Bedford-Strohm, denounced hateful comments in the Internet and their effects on her family. Bedford-Strohm, bishop of the evangelical church in Bavaria, knew Lösche as a student from his tenure as a professor at University of Bamberg.

In August 2018, Kriminalpolizei officials brought the suspect from Spain to Bavaria in Germany.

In late August 2018, during the Chemnitz protests following the murder of a football supporter, the far-right group calling themselves Pro-Chemnitz organized by Pegida and Alternative for Germany carried banners with pictures of murder victims, among which was the photo of Lösche which led to her family initiating legal action against those who used her picture to further an anti-immigration agenda.

== Victim ==
Lösche was a student at the University of Bamberg in Bavaria. She was politically active and was the president of the University SPD student club. The political aim of the club according to German media was that Bamberg become more diverse. From 2016 Lösche travelled regularly to the Greek island Lesbos as a volunteer for the No Borders NGO to cook for migrants arriving from Turkey. According to her brother, Lösche was involved in several initiatives "against racism, freedom of movement and opening of borders".

The coroner found no indications that Lösche had been subjected to sexual violence.

== Suspect and trial ==
The main suspect was Boujemaa Lamrabat, a male Moroccan national born in 1977, who picked up Sophia Lösche in his truck on his way to Morocco via France and Spain.

On 14 June 2019, the Landgericht Bayreuth announced that the trial for murder would commence on 23 July. While the prosecution had at first suspected a sexual motivation for the crime, the coroner found no evidence to support this and the prosecution therefore accused Lamrabat of murder and grievous bodily harm.

In September 2019, Lamrabat was sentenced to life in prison for murder. The court found that the suspect had at first seriously wounded Lösche with a wheel brace, then killed her later to hide the crime.

== See also ==
- List of solved missing person cases (post-2000)
- Pippa Bacca - Italian peace activist raped and murdered in Turkey
