= Rape in Germany =

Sexual violence in Germany

Wir haben Gesichter, in English "we have faces", a monument in Viktoriapark, Kreuzberg, at the site where a woman was raped in March 2002

In Germany, rape is defined by Section 177 of the country's criminal code, Strafgesetzbuch. The definition of rape has changed over time from its original formulation in the penal code established in 1871, as extramarital intercourse with a woman by force or the threat of violence. In 1997, laws were amended to criminalize marital rape, incorporate gender-neutral language, and recognize the effect of psychological coercion. In 2016, German laws were rewritten to remove a previous requirement that a victim physically resist their assailants and be overcome by force. The new law recognized any physical or verbal cue that one party does not consent to sexual contact. It also mandated deportation for migrants convicted of sexual assault, made it easier to prosecute rapes committed by groups, and criminalized other types of unwanted sexual contact, such as groping or fondling. The changes followed a series of high-profile cases that sparked public outrage at the inadequacy of the law.

== Modern prevalence ==
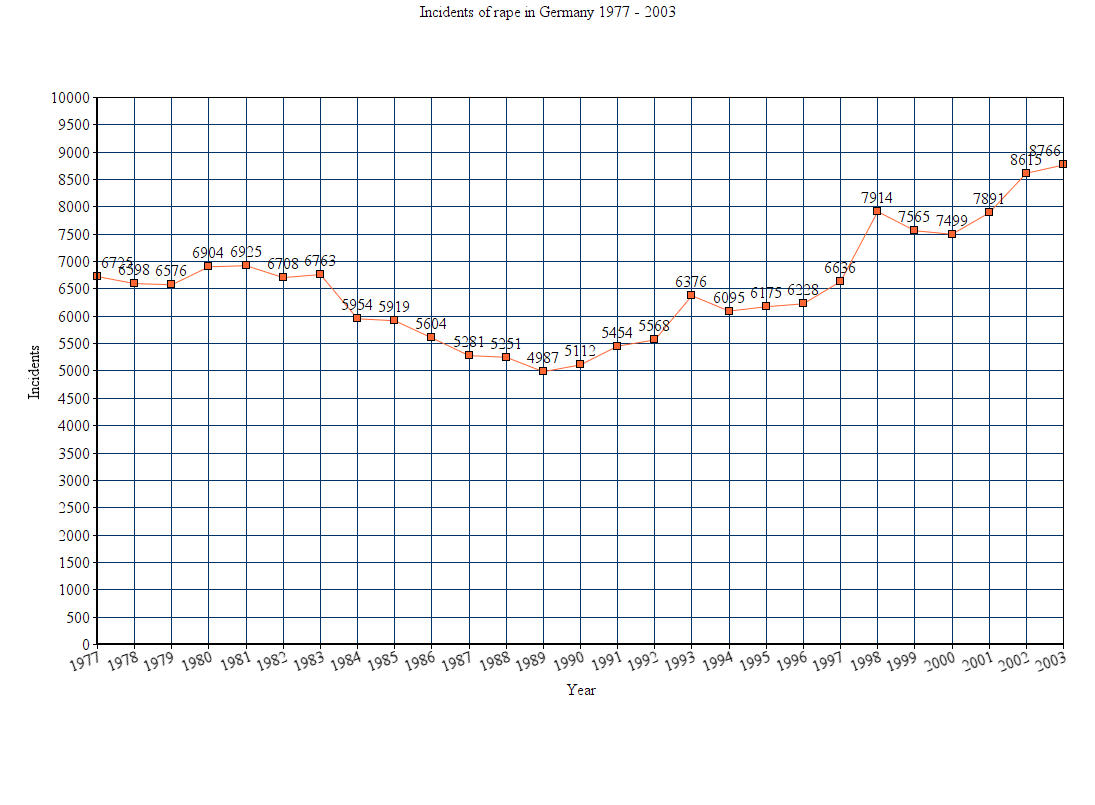
Incidents of rape and other sexual crimes (from 1998) in Germany from 1977 to 2003, according to statistics published by the Federal Criminal Police Office (Note: According to the footnote accompanying the related table of statistics in the original study, "The 6th Act on Criminal Law Reform regulates rape and sexual duress together in one provision. Therefore, as of 1998 the Police Crime Statistics count other serious forms of sexual duress alongside rape in this category, which probably explains the rise between 1997 and the following years.)

The prevalence of rape in Germany has remained relatively stable, and although the country has the second highest overall number of rapes reported in the EU, the number of reports per capita is average for the region. As of 1995 the recorded incidence of rape in Germany was 7.57 per 100,000 people. In 2009, about 7,314 rape cases were reported, a rate of 9 per 100,000 people. In 2011, there were about 7,539 reported cases of rape. (Note: Historical data on the prevalence of rape may be affected by a number of factors. Some data sets may only account for West Germany and/or a portion of Berlin prior to German Reunification. Substantial amendments to broaden the legal definition of rape, such as that which occurred in 1997, are also reflected in historical data. As of 2013, there are no regularly conducted national level surveys conducted in Germany on female victimization.)

In a 2005 study by the Federal Ministry of Family Affairs, Senior Citizens, Women and Youth, out of a sample of 10,264 women, 13% had experienced sexual violence after the age of 16, and of these, only 8% had reported the incident to law enforcement. From the same study, 6% reported experiencing rape, 4% attempted rape, 5% forced physical intimacy, and 4% some other form of forced sexual encounter. Nearly all (99%) of perpetrators were male, and half (49%) were current or former partners. For victims of sexual violence, 79% reported psychological symptoms, and 44% physical injuries.

A study into sexual abuse sponsored by the European Commission and conducted by the Vienna-based Fundamental Rights Agency showed 8% of women had experienced sexual violence by partners, and 7% had experienced sexual violence by non-partners. Overall, between 92% and 96% of victims were female, and 70% were aged 21 to 40. Around 25% of victims were non-white, more than half were employed or students, and 6% experienced mental health issues, while 2% had some disability.

Der Spiegel cited official crime statistics that 9.1% of sexual assaults reported in 2016 with at least one suspect registered had at least one suspect identified as an immigrant, a rise from 1.8% in 2012, and 2.6% in 2014. Some of this rise was attributed to the fact that in 2016, groping was made a criminal offence. (Note: "Immigrants" in this context included: "asylum-seekers; those who have been allowed to stay temporarily despite not having received asylum status, illegal immigrants; and refugees who have been brought into Germany on the basis of quotas. Suspects whose asylum applications have been approved are not included." Other foreigners are also not included.)

There is little data on rape or other sexual violence directed toward males, with "nearly all" available studies of sexual violence examining women as victims, and sexual violence against men "almost ignored". When taken into consideration, it is mostly concerning abuse of boys, rather than rape or assault as it pertains to adult males. One national study in Germany from 2004, as reported in a 2009 thesis, indicated that between 10% and 20% of boys are in some respect sexually abused, with about 33% of perpetrators being female.

=== Public debate on migrant crime ===
In 2018 a 14-year-old German Jewish girl, Susanna Feldmann was raped and murdered on the night of the 22 or 23 May 2018. Ali Bashar, a 20-year-old asylum seeker from Iraqi Kurdistan, was named as a suspect. The murder sparked a political debate in Germany. Ethnologist and head of the Research Centre of Global Islam Susanne Schröter at the Goethe University Frankfurt, said that these were no longer isolated incidents, speaking of a culture clash and suggesting that Germany needed to develop a new approach for dealing with aggressive men shaped by patriarchal cultures. According to Schröter, there are within Islam, as with other religions, patriarchal norms that legitimize violence and sexual assault against specific types of women, and therefore some men from Islamic countries may view women in a completely different way. Far-right parties and social media exploited the case for their own ends. A fact-checking article in Der Spiegel found that fears of immigrant crime had been amplified by far-right propaganda in the public debate beyond the actual increase which was supported by official statistics.

The debate resurfaced amid record police-recorded figures in 2025. According to the Federal Ministry of Interior's annual Polizeiliche Kriminalstatistik (PKS), released in April 2026, recorder rape cases rose 9.0% in 2025 compared with previous year and by roughly 72% since 2018. The Ministry reported that 98.6% of suspects were male, that non German nationals accounted for 38.5% of rape suspects and that non German victims made up 22.3% of affected. For violent crime generally, Interior Minister Alexander Dobrindt described the 42.9% share of non German suspects as a "considerable overrepresentation" ("erhebliche Überrepräsentanz"), a characterization he extended specifically to male Afghans and Syrians. Hesse Interior Minister Roman Poseck said part of the issue was that some migrant men held "a completely false understanding of gender roles" that led them to disregard women's rights to self determination.

=== Law enforcement response ===
According to a national report, the conviction rate for rape in Germany has declined: it was 20% in the 1980s, and by 2000 it was 13%. According to reports from Deutsche Presse-Agentur, prior to legal changes in 2016, 8% of rape trials resulted in a conviction. Conviction rates varied substantially across geographic areas, and according to income, with the three richest states having a conviction rate of 24% and seeing number of cases reduced to nearly 65% of their former levels, and the three poorest states seeing a 40% increase in cases and a 4% conviction rate.

Of those reported to authorities, most (87%) were reported by the victim, 96% were interviewed and provided a witness statement, but only 23% received a forensic medical examination, one of the lowest percentages in the EU.

== Legal history ==
Discussion of rape has long been a taboo in Germany, with victims, women's rights organizations, and politicians struggling for support on issues pertaining to sexual abuse and violence. There have been recent political discussions of reforming related laws so that they comply with the Istanbul convention, which requires all signatories to ensure that engaging in any non-consensual act of a sexual nature is criminalized.

Rape is generally reported to the police, although it is also allowed to be reported to the prosecutor or District Court. Many urban areas and states have specialist units for rape and sexual assault, but these efforts are not coordinated at the federal level, and the presence of such a unit is dependent on the finances of the area, and such units are absent in many rural areas.

Because of the German statutory maximum sentences, the harshest punishment possible for rape is imprisonment for a period of 15 years. However, because it is not legally a form of punishment, courts may order "subsequent preventive detention" following the completion of a prison sentence for rape, in cases where the perpetrator suffers from a mental disorder, or would represent a serious danger to the public upon release. These may be of an indefinite period, subject to periodic reviews. Officials may also temporarily deny perpetrators access to the household without a court order, put them under a restraining order, and require them to pay damages.

The statute of limitations for severe sexual coercion is 20 years, and that for less serious cases is 10. In cases where the victim is a minor, this timeframe begins once the child turns 18 years-of-age.

=== Penal code of 1871 ===
According to the German penal code established in 1871, the definition of rape was to compel "a woman to have extramarital intercourse...by force or the threat of present danger to life or limb," and was punishable by at least two years imprisonment. The law thus excluded any sexual contact between a married couple. Rape was grouped, along with sodomy and incest, as "crimes against personal honor, marriage, and the family." More extensive punishments were provided in cases where the victim (presumed to be female only) was younger than 16, in cases of gang rape, and in cases of "major physical violence".

=== Post-war legislation and 1973 reforms ===
The German penal code experienced a number of changes during the Nazi era. Changes considered in keeping with Nazi philosophy were removed by the Allied Control Council during the re-establishment of Germany.

A 1966 ruling of the Bundesgerichtshof required married women to have sexual intercourse with their partners "repeatedly" and prescribed they must not be "unresponsive" during the consummation.

Between 1969 and 1974 the West German penal code was reformed by five different pieces of legislation. The fourth law for the reform of the penal code, dated 23 November 1973 (Viertes Gesetz zur Reform des Strafrechts - 4. StrRG), introduced changes shifting the focus from violations of morality to violations against the individual.

=== 1997 reforms ===
In 1997, a broader definition was adopted, making the law gender neutral, abolishing the marital exemption, recognizing sexual violence which did not include penetration, and expanding the definition of force to include psychological coercion. This was done through the 13th criminal amendment, section 177–179, which deals with sexual abuse. The 1997 reform (due to the Dreiunddreißigstes Strafrechtsänderungsgesetz, 33rd law to change the penal code) created a new system by combining sexual assault and rape into one statue, with sexual assault as the "base" crime. Rape, which was now defined as involving penetration, was made into a subset of sexual assault, as a particularly serious form.

Reflecting the law's emphasis on the requirement for the use of force, a 2006 decision by the Federal Court of Justice of Germany overturned a lower court's conviction for rape, on the grounds that the "accused ripped off the clothes from the body of the co-plaintiff and had sexual intercourse with her against her explicitly expressed will”, but had not “forced the victim with violence". According to a study performed in 2014, by an organization of women's counseling and rape crisis centers, out of 107 studied cases of rape, the majority of perpetrators were not prosecuted, because their actions fell outside the legal definition at the time.

=== 1998 reforms ===
The Sixth Criminal Law Reform Act, passed in 1998 included a number of changes intended to harmonize sentencing for sexual, and non-sexual offenses, and generally resulted in increases in severity for sexual offenses. It also included provisions related to the protection of children, the disabled, the institutionalized, and drug addicts.

=== 2002 Violence Protection Act ===
The 2002 Violence Protection Act (Gewaltschutzgesetz) focussed broadly on all forms of domestic violence. While the previous assumption was that victims should leave their joint residence, the introduction of this law gave civil courts the power to serve orders on the perpetrator to vacate the residence.

=== 2016 reforms ===
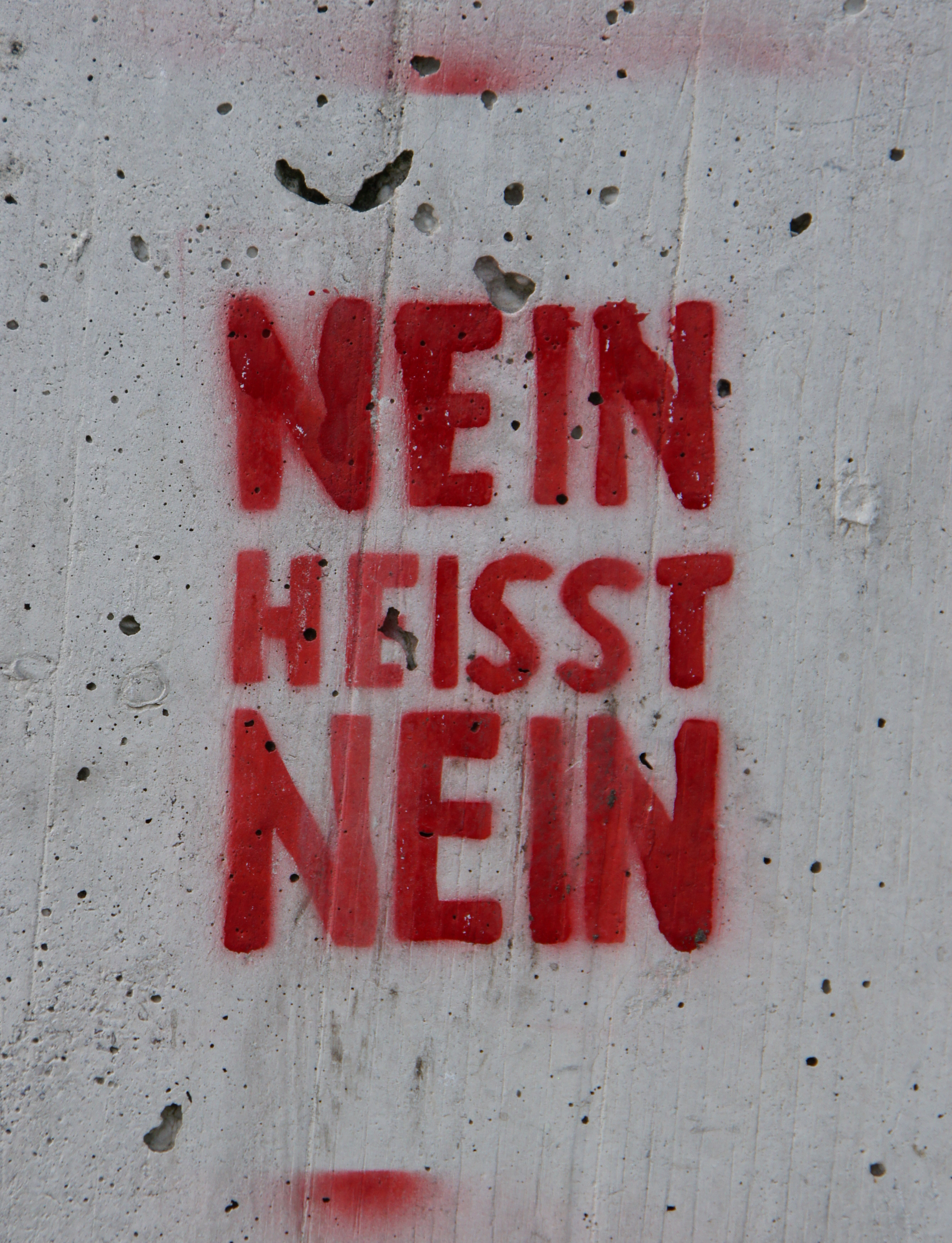
German language graffiti in Vienna from 2010, reading nein heisst nein, or "no means no"

On 23 September 2016, the law was reformed again, with a new focus on lack of consent rather than resistance on the part of the victim. It broadened the legal definition to include "any sexual act that a victim declines through verbal or physical cues, whereas the previous law required the victim fight back," and other forms of non-consensual sexual contact, such as groping and fondling, were not illegal. The new law strengthened penalties for all perpetrators of sexual assault, mandated deportation for convicted migrants, and made it easier to prosecute assaults committed by large groups.

The law also provided equal punishment under the following circumstances, if the perpetrator:

1. Exploits the fact that the person cannot consent
2. Exploits the fact that the person is significantly impaired because of a physical or mental condition, unless there is prior consent
3. Exploits an element of surprise
4. Exploits a situation in which the victim is threatened with serious harm in case of resistance
5. Coerces the person to actively engage in or tolerate sexual acts by threatening serious harm

Although the law dropped the previous requirement for the use of coercion or force by the perpetrator, it incorporated these elements as an aggravating factor, along with situations where the victim is incapacitated due to disease or disability.

The changes followed a series of cases that sparked public outrage, and the popularity of the #NeinHeisstNein (no means no) campaign. These included the acquittal of two men charged with drugging and raping Gina-Lisa Lohfink, and posting video of it online, a video in which "she reportedly says 'stop it' and 'no' as they force themselves on her". It also followed the events of the 2015/2016 New Year's Eve, mainly in the city of Cologne, where hundreds of women were sexually assaulted, but through actions which, it was ultimately determined, were not illegal under the current law. Other high-profile cases included the 2016 murder of Maria Ladenburger and 2018 killing of Susanna Feldman, which gained attention because the attacks were carried out by immigrants.

According to reports, statistics show that in 2025, 53% of Gang rape suspects in Germany, were foreigners, with 80%of the victims being German citizens.

== Statutory rape ==
Consensual sex is legal from the age of 14 in most cases. There is an exception if the older partner is above the age of 18, and is “exploiting a coercive situation” or offering compensation, and the younger partner is under 16. It is also illegal for someone older than 21 to have sex with someone under the age of 16 if the older person “exploits the victim’s lack of capacity for sexual self-determination.”

== Services for victims ==
Beginning in 1984, victims may access government funded legal services according to means tested eligibility criteria. More commonly, victims who cannot afford legal representation may be appointed a lawyer; however, prosecutors are obliged to pursue the case regardless of whether the victim is a party to the proceedings. Victims may also receive services from privately run Weisser Ring ("White Ring") victim support organizations, or Notruf, "BIG" and Wildwasser rape crisis centers located throughout the country. Representatives from these organizations may accompany the victims in filing reports, during interviews, and throughout legal proceedings.

== World War II ==
In the Soviet invasion of Germany during World War II a large number of mass rapes were committed by the Red Army, in Germany as well as in other countries previously occupied by the Nazi army. Estimates range from tens of thousands to as many as two million victims, with non-Slavic and particularly ethnically German women targeted. In the words of one contemporary observer, "the Russian soldiers were raping every German female from eight to eighty." Many victims were mutilated, and subjected to gang rape or repeated rape over the course of several days. The Soviet leadership did little to prevent the violence. (Note: Upon crossing into East Prussia, the orders given to Soviet troops offered the guidance, 'on German soil there is only one master – the Soviet soldier, that he is both the judge and the punisher for the torments of his fathers and mothers, for the destroyed cities and villages... ‘remember your friends are not there, there is the next of kin of the killers and oppressors.'")

Some have estimated the number of rapes committed by U.S. servicemen in Germany to be 11,000, with the phrase "copulation without conversation is not fraternization" allegedly being used as a motto by United States Army troops.

One survey estimates that the French occupation forces committed "385 rapes in the Constance area; 600 in Bruchsal; and 500 in Freudenstadt." French Moroccan soldiers were alleged to have committed widespread rape in the Höfingen District near Leonberg. According to historian Norman Naimark and colleagues, "the poor discipline and rapacity of soviet soldier was matched in the Western zones only by French Moroccan troops," specifically during the occupations of Baden and Württemberg.

== See also ==
- Estimates of sexual violence
- Initiatives to prevent sexual violence
- Post-assault treatment of sexual assault victims
- Rape by gender
- Rape in France
- Rape in Sweden
- Rape of males
- Rape statistics
- Violence against women
- Women's rights
