= Murder of Mia Valentin =

2017 killing in Germany

- Location: Kandel, Rhineland-Palatinate, Germany
- Date: 27 December 2017; 8 years ago
- Attack type: Stabbing
- Weapon: Bread knife
- Victim: Mia Valentin
- Perpetrator: Abdul Mobin Dawodzai
- Motive: Revenge for breakup, jealousy
- Verdict: Guilty
- Convictions: Murder, bodily harm

On 27 December 2017, 15-year-old Mia Valentin was murdered in Kandel, Rhineland-Palatinate, Germany. The perpetrator was Valentin's ex-boyfriend, Abdul Dawodzai, an Afghan asylum seeker, who had been denied refugee status.

In September 2018, Dawodzai was found guilty of murder by a Landau court and given a juvenile sentence of eight years and six months imprisonment. He died by suicide at JVA Schifferstadt in October 2019.

The case was reported in the national and international press and sparked a political debate about the German refugee policies, especially how to deal with underage unaccompanied refugees.

== Background ==
Valentin and Dawodzai were classmates and had had a relationship for several months. In the beginning of December 2017, after she had ended the relationship, he allegedly began to threaten Valentin. She and her parents filed a criminal complaint to the police on 15 December 2017, alleging that Dawodzai had slandered and threatened their daughter.

On the morning of 27 December 2017, police officers had visited the later perpetrator. Dawodzai bought the knife at the same store just before he attacked her.

== Incident ==
In the afternoon of 27 December 2017, Valentin was killed by Dawodzai while browsing a drugstore. Dawodzai had followed Valentin inside and stabbed her seven times using a 20 cm knife. She died shortly afterwards in hospital.

== Perpetrator ==
The perpetrator was Abdul Mobin Dawodzai (Pashto: عبدالمبين داودزی), who came to Germany from Afghanistan in April 2016. He registered as an unaccompanied minor and initially resided in Frankfurt, later in a center for young refugees in Germersheim. His asylum claim was rejected in February 2017, but he was not deported as he was listed as underaged. Valentin's parents had previously voiced suspicions that Dawodzai was older than 15. The perpetrator had been known to the police for a serious bodily injury crime committed in school.

== Legal proceedings ==
The suspect was charged with murder, and underwent a medical examination in response to allegations that he had misstated his age. The age assessment was carried out by evaluating X-rays of hand, clavicle and dentition of the suspect. The findings of the examination were presented by the State's attorney in February 2018. These findings concluded that the suspect was at least 17 years and six months old, but most likely around 20. As physicians attested that he was certainly below the age of 21 at the time of the crime, he was tried under Germany's juvenile court system.

Dawodzai's lawyer denied he was older than 20. The prosecution called for a 10 year sentence while the defense attorney asked for a 7.5 year sentence.

== Trial and sentence ==
Because of the age of the accused, the case was heard privately in a juvenile court. Anti-immigration demonstrators assembled in the streets of Kandel in September 2018 to await the announcement of the verdict, with counter-protests from locals. When the sentence of 8 years in prison for the convicted murderer was announced, Deutsche Welle noted that the social media accounts of Alternative for Germany politicians "lit up" with criticism of the brevity of the sentence, while members of the governing Social Democratic Party were silent. A political consultant said that #Kandel had enabled the right wing to "take a singular, exceptional event and "abstract" it into a national problem".

On 3 September 2018, Dawodzai was sentenced to 8 years and 6 months in prison for murder of Valentin. Maximilian Ender, Dawodzai's lawyer said to reporters that he thought the court decision was correct, and that his client had "accepted" the verdict. Locals protested outside the court calling the sentence of 8.5 years for murder too short.

== Aftermath ==
=== Political debate ===
The murder reignited German public debate over refugee policy, in particular, debate over abuse of refugee policy by adult men claiming to be child refugees.

Several politicians of FDP, CDU, CSU, AfD, SPD and also Green parties demanded a better control of young unaccompanied refugees as a consequence of the case. The authorities of Rhineland-Palatinate began an investigation to determine consequences. Julia Klöckner (CDU) offered condolences to the parents of Mia Valentin and demanded an investigation, as did Eva Högl (SPD). Stephan Mayer (CSU) demanded a hardened course against underage offenders. Alexander Gauland (AfD) stated that the German policies of open borders were responsible for the case. Konstantin von Notz (The Greens) demanded a better prevention and a closer look to the underage unaccompanied refugees. The Interior Minister of Bavaria, Joachim Herrmann (CSU) demanded an age test for all underage refugees who were not clearly recognizable as children. FDP chairman Christian Lindner suggested faster deportation of underage criminal asylum seekers.

Annegret Kramp-Karrenbauer, Minister President of Saarland spoke out in favor of obligatory age tests of young refugees, as did the Deutscher Städte- und Gemeindebund. Official investigations in some German states showed, that at least 30 to 50 percent of the age records of alleged underage refugees are wrong.

Unlike other German TV news broadcasters, news magazine Tagesschau did not report the case at first, later explaining that it does not normally report on domestic crime, especially where children are involved. After criticism in social media, the paper published a report.

=== Protests ===
Two months after the attack there were demonstrations in the town, involving over a thousand people. The local authorities claimed that most of the anti-immigration demonstrators were not from Kandel and that the town was being used as a "platform" by right-wingers. A separate group simultaneously demonstrated against racism.

Funeral candles with pictures of Mia Valentin along with photos of Mireille B murdered 2018 in Flensburg and Maria Ladenburger murdered in 2016 in Freiburg were placed by anti-Islamic protesters outside chancellor Angela Merkel's office in Stralsund.

=== Kandel Is Everywhere ===
Following Mia's murder, an initiative entitled "Kandel Is Everywhere" took root in Germany. It has held protests, created Stolpersteine decrying the murders of Germans by foreigners, and produced a poster that went viral that includes Mia and Susanna Feldmann, under the heading “Merkel’s Stolpersteine.” On 14 April 2018, around 250 persons gathered at the Ballhausplatz in Vienna to commemorate the victim and to call for restrictions on immigration.

=== Suicide ===
On 10 October 2019, it was announced that Abdul D. had been found dead in his cell, of apparent suicide. The police department of Rheinpfalz commented: "At the moment, there are no indications of outside influence. Suicidal intentions were not recognizable according to the prison management."

== Documentary The Girl and the Refugee ==
The documentary The Girl and the Refugee, which is Episode 5 of the series What Moves Germany, was shown on 4 June 2018 on Das Erste, a public television channel in Germany. The documentary is about the murder of Mia Valentin, and about the attempted murder by stabbing of a 17-year-old girl by another Afghan refugee in Darmstadt five days earlier. Looking for answers, the filmmakers travel to Afghanistan where they are told that a woman who separates from her man "must be killed." The documentary is an hr-SWR co-production, directed by Christian Gropper and Kai Diezemann.

== See also ==
- Immigration and crime in Germany
- Reutlingen knife attack
- Murder of Mireille B
- Murder of Maria Ladenburger
