= 2018 Chemnitz protests =

2018 German anti-immigration unrest

2018 Chemnitz Protests
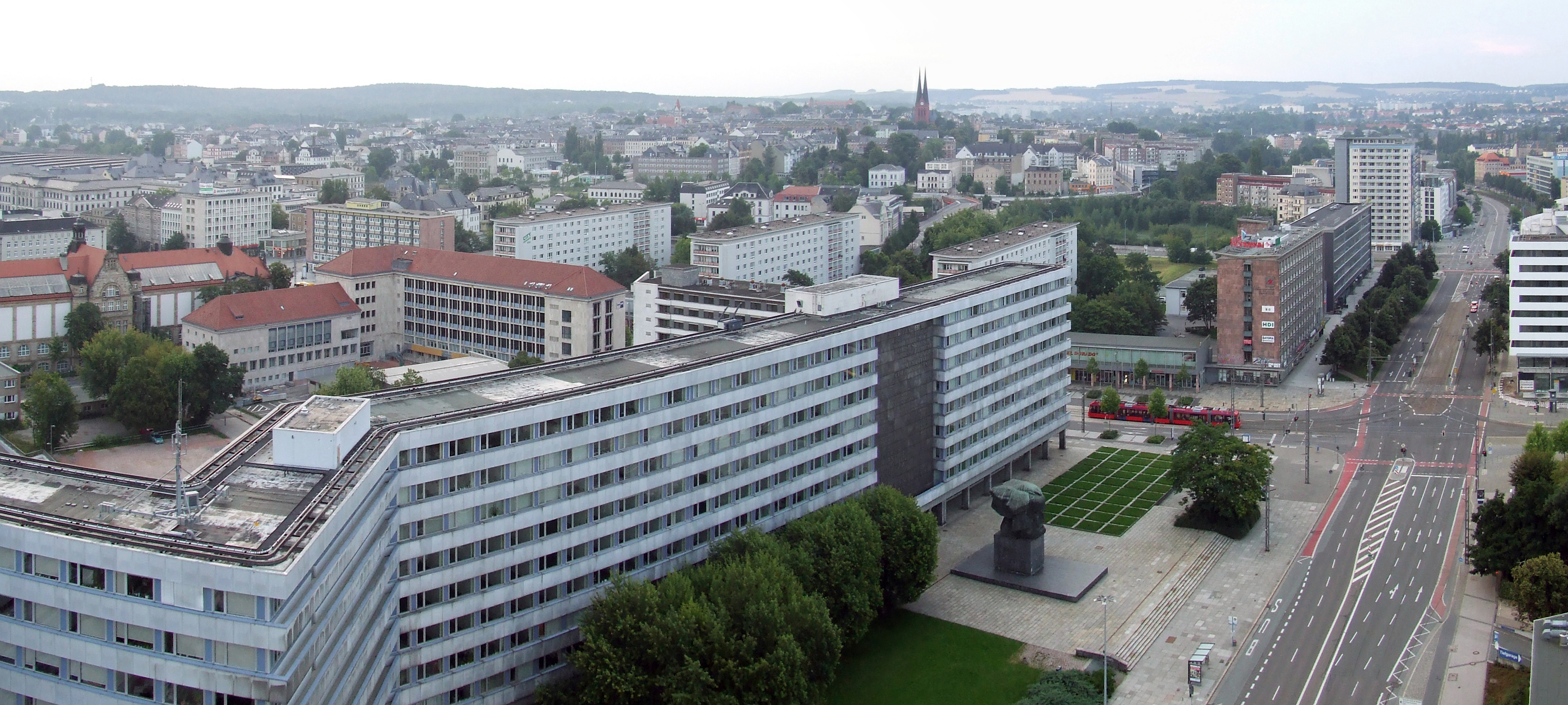
- The Brückenstraße in Chemnitz, where the stabbing attack and several protests occurred
- Date: 26 August – 1 September 2018
- Location: Brückenstraße, Chemnitz, Germany
- Caused by: Stabbing of a German man by immigrants
- Methods: Protests, Demonstrations, Rioting, Assault

Parties
Right-wing and Nationalist protestors: AfD; Pro Chemnitz; Kaotic Chemnitz; NPD; Faust des Ostens	Chemnitz Police	Left-wing counter-protesters

Number
8,000	600	1,500

Casualties
- Deaths: 1
- Injuries: 23

The 2018 Chemnitz protests took place in Chemnitz, in the German state of Saxony. In the early morning of 26 August, after a festival celebrating the city's founding, a fight broke out resulting in the death of a German man and serious injuries to two other people. Two Kurdish immigrants, one from Iraq and the other from Syria, were named as suspects. The incident reignited the tensions surrounding immigration to Germany, which had been ongoing since 2015, and the European migrant crisis. In response, mass protests against immigration were ignited by far-right groups. The protests spawned riots and were followed by counter-demonstrations.

== Background ==
Chemnitz was named Karl-Marx-Stadt when it was part of East Germany, from 1953 to 1990. In 2017, almost a quarter of the city's residents voted in elections for the right wing to far right political party Alternative for Germany (AfD).

In 2015, the German borders remained open during the European migrant crisis, and nearly 1 million migrants applied for asylum by the end of 2016. Over 12% of the German population is foreign-born; in December 2025, opinion polling of the German electorate estimated that 53% supported and 35% opposed "admitting no more new migrants, and requiring large numbers of migrants who came to Germany in recent years to leave."

== Fight and stabbing ==
=== Incident ===
At 3:15 am on Sunday 26 August, a brawl erupted in the street of Brückenstraße in Chemnitz. According to police, the fight was between "several people of various nationalities." Up to 10 people were at the scene. Three of them were stabbed and seriously injured; one of the three, Daniel Hillig, later died in the hospital.

=== Victims ===
Daniel Hillig, who was stabbed and died in the hospital, was a 35-year-old German carpenter, the son of a German mother and a Cuban father. He had a seven year-old son, and a wife. Hillig, who grew up in Chemnitz, was apparently well-known by many people and various political groups in the city.

The two other people who were seriously injured were Russia Germans (that is, ethnic Germans born in Russia and repatriated to Germany).

At the location where Hillig was stabbed, a large memorial was set up, where people gathered to mourn. Hillig was a football supporter of Chemnitzer FC, and some have speculated that this might have contributed to the strong fan reaction; the Chemnitzer fan club representative and local politician Peggy Schellenberg (SPD) visited the crime scene immediately on Sunday.

=== Suspects ===
Suspects include a 23-year-old Kurdish Syrian and a 22-year-old Kurdish Iraqi, who were taken into custody near the scene. The German district court issued an arrest warrant for them on 27 August. The same day, the prosecutors said that the two men were suspected of having stabbed Hillig several times "with no justifiable reason." One of these suspects was named in the days after the attack as Yousif Ibrahim Abdullah from Bashiqa, and the arrest warrant for him was leaked in multiple newspapers on 28 August, which went against German privacy regulations. Abdullah was accused of stabbing Hillig five times, including the fatal hits to his pericardium and lung. The other suspect was identified as Alaa Sheikhi, although his motivations have yet to be revealed.

Yousif Abdullah has a criminal record with six offences, which include fraud and drug possession. He was most recently sentenced in July 2018 to a suspended sentence of eight months for dangerous bodily harm. He came to Germany in 2015 via the Balkans and was to be deported in 2016 to Bulgaria, where he had first applied for asylum, but a six-month deadline for the deportation was missed by the German authorities. His application for asylum was rejected, but he won in the legal proceedings afterwards; he used an alleged love affair as the justification for this later rejected application for asylum, saying that the brother and uncle of a girl he was in love with had beaten him up and injured him with a knife. Three days after the stabbing of Hillig, his application for asylum was rejected again. He has also used two different identities and forged documents, during the asylum proceedings. He was known for always carrying a knife with him.

Police in Saxony announced on 4 September that they were "urgently" seeking a third suspect in the murder, Farhad Ramazan Ahmad, listing him as a 22-year-old Iraqi citizen who was possibly armed and dangerous.

=== Reactions to stabbing ===
The festival during which the stabbing happened ended earlier than planned because of the stabbing. It was on this day that protests began in the city. Chancellor Angela Merkel's office condemned the demonstration on Twitter. German Interior Minister Horst Seehofer (CSU) expressed his condolences to Hillig's family. Seehofer said that the "consternation" of the people was "understandable," but on the other hand he condemned the violence. He also stated that the local police were in a "difficult situation," and offered Federal Police help to Saxony.

One German politician, Martina Renner (Die Linke), accused right-wing people of exploiting the apparent murder to their own political ends, also reminding people that in the days following the attack, the motivation was still unclear.

On 31 August 2018, Franziska Giffey, German Minister for Family Affairs, Senior Citizens, Women and Youth, visited the crime scene of the stabbing, being the first member of the German federal government to do so. The media asked why Merkel "sent the Family Affairs Minister" on such an errand.

==== Police criticism ====
Friends of the victim criticised the police in Chemnitz for their "failure to control the three-day city festival." Some of the leftist protesters used slogans that criticised police for not being there when Hillig was stabbed but appearing at the protests, with journalists noting that there had been fighting before the attack at the festival.

There were several rumours circulating after the stabbing, including that the attack was in response to sexual harassment, and that another of the injured men had died. Chemnitz police took to social media to stop these. It was reported that the misinformation and inability to stop its spread contributed to the strength of the riots.

The politician Kerstin Köditz said that the police took too long to react, and questioned how they didn't have any action or even a plan to put into action once they knew that somebody had been killed at a festival.

=== Legal proceedings ===
Police arrested a 22-year-old Iraqi national and a 23-year-old Kurdish Syrian on suspicions of manslaughter. A special prosecutor charged with handling extremism in Saxony was given charge of the case. The prosecutor in Chemnitz rejected any claims that the suspects were acting in self-defense. In March 2019, court proceedings commenced in the Chemnitzer Landgericht.

In August 2019, 24-year-old Kurdish Syrian national Alaa S. was declared guilty of murder and bodily harm and sentenced to nine years and six months prison time. For security reasons, the verdict was announced in a building belonging to the Higher Regional Court of Dresden.

== Protests and riots ==
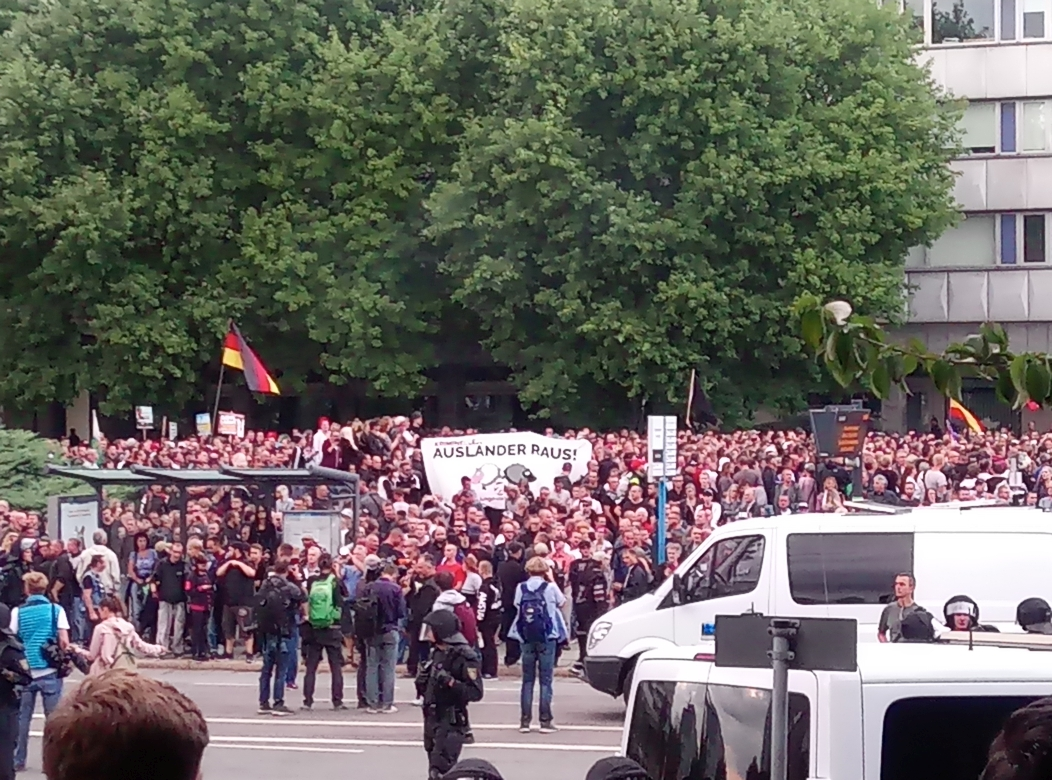
Protesters in Chemnitz on 27 August 2018. The banner demands Kriminelle Ausländer raus! ("Criminal foreigners out!").

As a response to the stabbing, far right groups protested against migrants and refugees coming to Germany. Leftist groups began counter-protests nearby.

The first protest was organized by the right wing party Alternative for Germany on the afternoon of the stabbing. The protest was relatively small, consisting of about 100 people, and it finished without any violence. Later in the evening, another protest was organized by individuals belonging to the right-wing Kaotic Chemnitz group. This protest became violent, and the group also incited individuals to attack and harass foreigners and people who appeared to be non-ethnic Germans. The rioters attacked police officers who were deployed to calm the protests. There were also more demonstrations announced by both leftist and right-wing groups. The riots and protests continued into the next day, with the Pro Chemnitz right-wing populist group organizing a large protest. This initially included about 800 people gathered at the city's iconic Karl Marx monument. Deutsche Welle reported that the size of this group quickly expanded into the thousands, and grew less peaceful. Police estimated that the protesters numbered approximately 6,000. As the right-wing protest grew, a counter-protest, consisting of about 1,500 people, began on the other side of the square. Initially, the two main protesting groups were a short distance from each other, separated by a group of 600 riot police.

The protests became violent at around 9 p.m. local time on Monday, 27 August, when the protesters began to actively demonstrate and move. Masked protesters from both sides began to throw solid objects and fireworks, with some far wing protesters also performing the Nazi salute. At least twenty people were injured. An extensive police force equipped with water cannons was deployed and a second set of demonstrators belonging to the far left were kept at a distance by police. The rioters had reportedly calmed down by Tuesday morning, but far-right groups encouraged people to continue protesting.

The anti-immigration group, calling themselves Pro Chemnitz, carried banners with right-wing slogans during the protest. Some of the banners showed pictures of murder victims, among which was the photo of murdered student Sophia Lösche which led to her family initiating legal action against those who used her picture to further a political agenda. There were also reports of Neo-Nazi groups taking part, which included The III. Path, the National Democratic Party of Germany, the Die Rechte, some Freie Kameradschaften groups, the Junge Nationalisten, Autonome Nationalisten, as well as other right-wing to far-right groups like the NS-Boys, the Faust des Ostens, Inferno, and other right-wing organisations like Wir sind Kandel, Pegida, Wir für Deutschland, Bündnis Zukunft Hildburghausen, The Republicans, the German Social Union, the Sächsische Volkspartei, the Reichsbürger movement and the Identitarian movement. Leftist groups carried banners, including ones accusing some of the right-wing parties of being Nazis. Several protests marched down Brückenstraße, the wide street dividing the city centre. Many shops in this area are run by Middle Eastern people, and closed on the day of the demonstrations. The Brückenstraße is also where the murder took place, and a small shrine erected at the site was left untouched. Police called in reinforcements from Leipzig and Dresden. When the media began filming the rioters, some of the protestors shouted "Lügenpresse", a largely Nazi-era term that holds roughly the same meaning as the term "fake news."

On 30 August, a more peaceful rally organized by Pro Chemnitz took place near the Chemnitzer FC arena, and was attended by up to 900 people. At the same time, the Prime Minister of Saxony, Michael Kretschmer, accompanied by other state and local politicians, held a "consultation hour" in the arena, which was attended by 550 citizens. At the front of the 1 September rallies, protesters carried the photo of Susanna Feldmann.

=== Reactions to riots and aftermath ===
A spokesman for German Chancellor Angela Merkel, Steffen Seibert, denounced the protests, saying that the violence "has no place in [the] country," also saying that there is no place for "vigilantism, for groups that want to spread hatred on the streets, for intolerance and racism." He also said that they do not tolerate "unlawful assemblies." The mayor of Chemnitz, Barbara Ludwig, said that the protests were "terrible" and that she was "incensed" at the violence.

The federal government characterized people "hunting down" immigrants, and equally people attacking the hunters in retaliation, as "vigilante justice," which Seibert said did not belong in Germany. An attack against a Syrian immigrant in the town of Wismar was connected by the media with the violence in Chemnitz. However, the Prime Minister of Saxony, Michael Kretschmer, criticized the reporting on the "manhunt" and stated no such a thing had taken place. On August 29, the Government of Saxony requested the help of the Federal Police.

One of the vice presidents of the German Bundestag, Wolfgang Kubicki (FDP), claimed that Angela Merkel's dictum, "Wir schaffen das," was the "root of the violence" in Chemnitz. The SPD's chairwoman and the SPD's group leader in the Bundestag, Andrea Nahles, called this an "unbelievable statement by an experienced politician." The Swiss Federal Department of Foreign Affairs supplemented its travel advice for Germany, telling people to "be careful in the vicinity of demonstrations, as riots are possible."

On 31 August 2018, the police said that the football match of the 2nd Bundesliga between Dynamo Dresden and Hamburger SV on 1 September 2018 should be cancelled. The DFL later confirmed in a statement that the game was canceled, at the discretion of the State Ministry of Interior.

=== Continuing protests ===
Although lacking the violence of the August protests, weekly far-right protests have continued in Chemnitz. Far-right groups have held weekly demonstrations on Fridays continuing to "denounce immigrants."
