= 2018 Burgwedel stabbing =

Stabbing attack in Burgwedel, Germany

On 25 March 2018, 24-year-old Vivien K. was stabbed by a Syrian migrant in Burgwedel, Germany. She received life-threatening injuries and was put into an induced coma. She woke up three days later, with broken ribs and part of her pancreas as well as her spleen removed.

Since the culprits were teenage refugees, the case sparked a discussion about migration policies, and as it was part of a string of knife attacks, it led to concerns about a rise in knife crime in Germany.

== Attack ==
At 19:30, the victim and her partner went to a supermarket in the Lower Saxony town near Hannover and had a dispute with two young Syrian migrants, 13 and 14 years of age which ended peacefully. The youths had been fighting inside the supermarket and the victim had tried to get them to separate. In addition, Domenic, Vivian K.'s partner, is said to have pulled one of the youths' ears. Later, another 17-year-old Syrian migrant, Abdalla M., joined the first two on scene and they later encountered the couple again. Another argument ensued and Abdalla M. targeted the woman with a knife stab to the abdomen. She got up on her feet after being stabbed, but collapsed shortly afterwards. The attacker fled but was arrested shortly and taken into custody on suspicion of grievous bodily harm and the weapon was secured.

== Perpetrator ==
The 17-year-old perpetrator, Abdalla M., and his extended family came to Germany in 2013 as refugees from the outskirts of Damascus, the capital of Syria. The 13-year-old is his brother and the 14-year-old his cousin. In April 2018, the perpetrator confessed. The defense lawyer raised the hypothesis that the Syrian refugee may be mentally ill and therefore not responsible.

Abdullah A. explained that in their culture whenever the family honor is involved stabbing with a knife was justified.

== Trial ==
On 21 August 2018 the trial of the two brothers, 17 and 14 years old, began at Hanover Landgericht. The elder, Abdullah A., was tried for attempted manslaughter and grievous bodily harm and the younger brother, Mohamad A., for assault. While Abdullah A. was initially only suspected of grievous bodily harm due to only having stabbed the victim once, but according to medical expertise the stab by Abdullah A. was a potentially deadly attack as he damaged internal organs as well as breaking two ribs of his victim.

Abdullah A. was sentenced to five years of youth prison, a shorter sentence was given due to his low age. His younger brother Mohamad A. was sentenced to 14 days in custody and 10 hours social upbringing. The 13-year-old cousing was not tried due to his low age.

== Aftermath ==
The attack, which was one of a spate of knife attacks by asylum seekers, several of whom were teenagers, precipitated a debate about youth crime and the integration of migrants. Stephan Weil, the Prime Minister of Lower Saxony expressed his sympathies for the victim. The municipality of Burgwedel stated its continued commitment to integration on its Facebook page, which was derided in comments. In early April, ten of the comments were investigated for constituting hate speech. As a result of the comments, the Facebook page was closed, with the municipality concerned that such comments might damage its reputation. The anti-immigration AfD party was accused of "exploiting" the attack after it set up a booth in Burgwedel following the attack.

Following the attack, the leader of the CDU party in the Lower Saxon Landtag, Dirk Toepffer, commented that family reunification of migrants with parents or siblings as means to reduce excessive violence, as promoted by the SPD party, had been disproven.
