= Flensburg stabbing incident =

2018 crime in Germany

The Flensburg stabbing incident occurred on 30 May 2018, when a female police officer traveling off-duty on a high-speed train in Flensburg, Germany, was stabbed by an Eritrean man. He then attacked a male passenger who came to her aid. The perpetrator was then shot and killed by the police officer. The motive behind the stabbing was not clear. The man was a refugee, who had arrived in Germany in September 2015 and had a history of violent altrications. The incident was not considered terrorism.

== Attack ==
Police and prosecutors confirmed the following progression of events: a 22-year-old female police officer, who was traveling off-duty on the train but wearing her uniform, was on the way to the exit inside a train, when she was attacked by the presumed perpetrator with a kitchen knife as she moved towards the exit door. A fellow passenger, 35 years old, tried to separate the police officer and the attacker, whereupon the perpetrator turned on him, attacking and injuring the passenger who had gone to the aid of the officer; he was left with serious injuries and a broken arm. His counterattack did succeed in drawing the assailant away from the officer, enabling her to draw her service pistol and shoot the perpetrator, killing him. News reports in the first several days after the attack misstated the facts, reporting that the perpetrator had quarreled with the passenger who went to the officer's aid and attacked him before attacking the officer.

Although it was initially reported that there were no witnesses, a witness did come forward and confirm the events of the attack.

== Attacker ==
The attacker was a 24-year-old Eritrean refugee who arrived in Germany in September 2015. According to officials, he had attacked a neighbour with an iron rod in April 2015. He was also suspected of having previously threatened people with a knife.

== Aftermath ==
The interior minister of Germany, Horst Seehofer, commented that violence could never be tolerated regardless of whether it was directed towards the police or the people.

The Flensburger Tageblatt reported that no Deutsche Bundesbahn security employees were on board the train. A spokesman from the Press Office of the Federal Police in Potsdam said that in dangerous situations aboard trains, travelers should notify authorities and "show moral courage."
