= Dirk Toepffer =

German politician (born 1965)

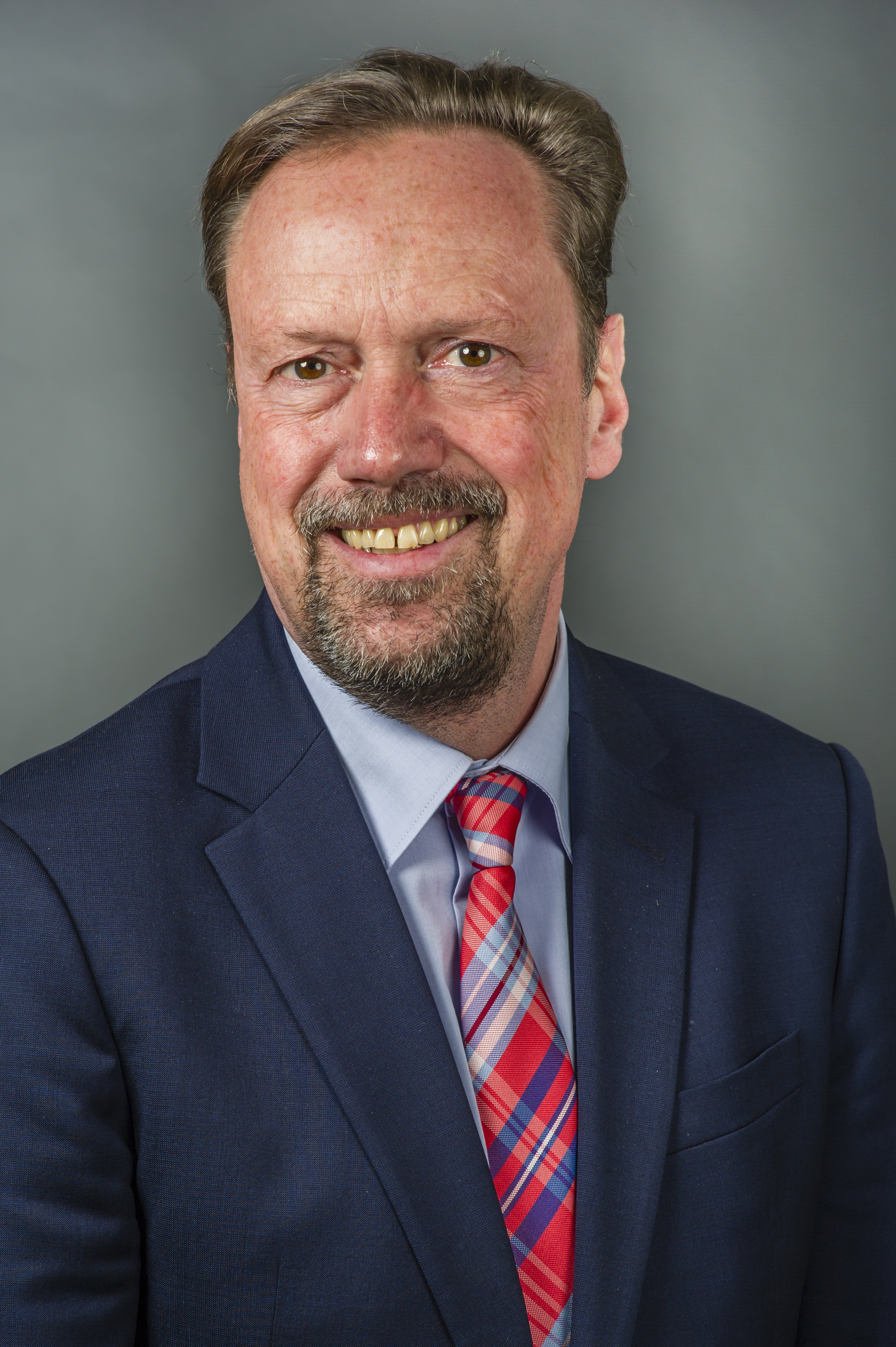
- Toepffer in 2018

Member of the Landtag of Lower Saxony
- Incumbent
- Assumed office 26 February 2008
- Constituency: Hannover-Döhren (2008–2017)

Personal details
- Born: 6 June 1965 (age 61) Hannover
- Party: Christian Democratic Union (since 1983)

Dirk Toepffer (born 6 June 1965 in Hannover) is a German politician serving as a member of the Landtag of Lower Saxony since 2008. From 2017 to 2022, he served as group leader of the Christian Democratic Union.
