= 2016 Reutlingen knife attack =

Stabbing incident in Germany

Reutlingen knife attack
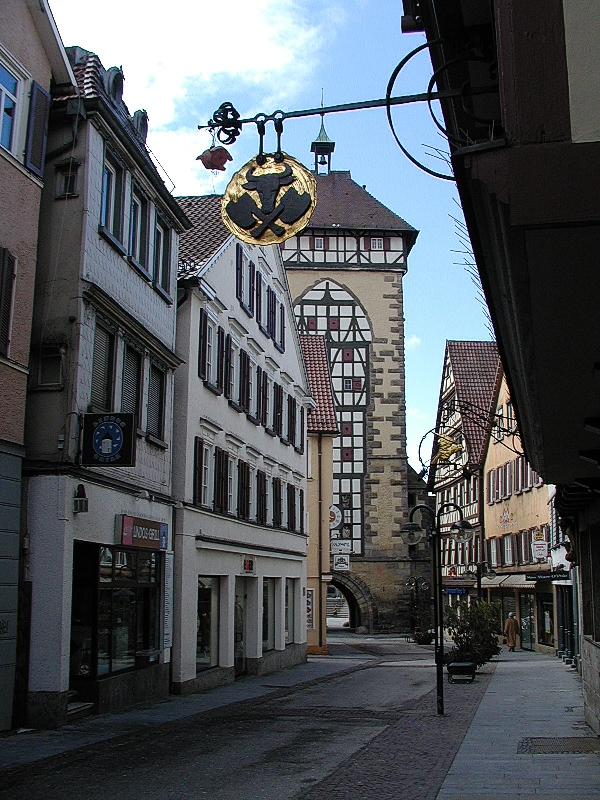
- A street in Reutlingen
- Location: Reutlingen, Baden-Württemberg, Germany
- Date: 24 July 2016
- Attack type: Mass stabbing
- Weapon: Döner knife
- Deaths: 1
- Injuries: 3 (including the attacker)
- Perpetrator: A Syrian asylum-seeker

On 24 July 2016, a Syrian asylum seeker armed with a döner knife, attacked his girlfriend and bystanders in Reutlingen, Germany, killing his girlfriend, a Polish woman, and wounding two other people in the forearm and head, before being struck accidentally by a car and arrested by police.

== Attack ==
The attack took place around 16:30 CEST (14:30 UTC) by a kebab shop where the perpetrator, a 21-year-old Syrian asylum-seeker, and his 45-year old victim both worked, and from where he retrieved the weapon.

The attacker and the victim had an argument before the attack. The attacker then killed her with the weapon he retrieved from the shop and also injured another woman and a man. He was subdued by the police after he was accidentally hit by a car whose driver was distracted by the surrounding commotion.

The Polish embassy confirmed that the victim, was Polish and claimed she was pregnant. Police are investigating under the assumption that it was a personal quarrel between the assailant and the dead woman.

== Perpetrator ==
The assailant was identified as a 21-year-old asylum seeker from Syria who had migrated to Germany about one-and-a-half years before the attack. He worked at the same Turkish kebab shop where the pregnant victim worked. He was known to police and was previously arrested for causing bodily harm. He had lived in a home in the town for seven months. One of his former roommates identified his first name as Mohamed and described him as an alcoholic who was feared by his other roommates. He also said that the attacker was in a relationship with the victim and both had previously lived together in a refugee camp.

== Trial and sentencing ==
In April 2017, the perpetrator was tried and sentenced to life in prison.

== Impact ==
This attack, one of four violent crimes, including the Ansbach bombing, committed by people of Middle Eastern background during the week of 18 July 2016 – three of them committed by asylum seekers – created significant political pressure for changes in the German government policy of welcoming refugees. According to The Washington Times, the attacks increased public fears that Islamist terrorist attacks of the kind that took place in France in 2015 and 2016 could happen in Germany. Florian Otto, a risk consultant from Maplecroft, said the attacks are likely to inflame anti-immigration sentiment in the country, creating a challenge for the Merkel government's policies.

In March 2017, Kenan Malik described the attack in the Guardian pointing up "the difficulty... in drawing a distinction between jihadi violence and the fury of disturbed minds."

== See also ==
- Munich knife attack (10 May 2016)
- Immigration and crime in Germany
- List of mass stabbings in Germany
