= Murder of Maria Ladenburger =

2016 aggravated rape and murder in Germany

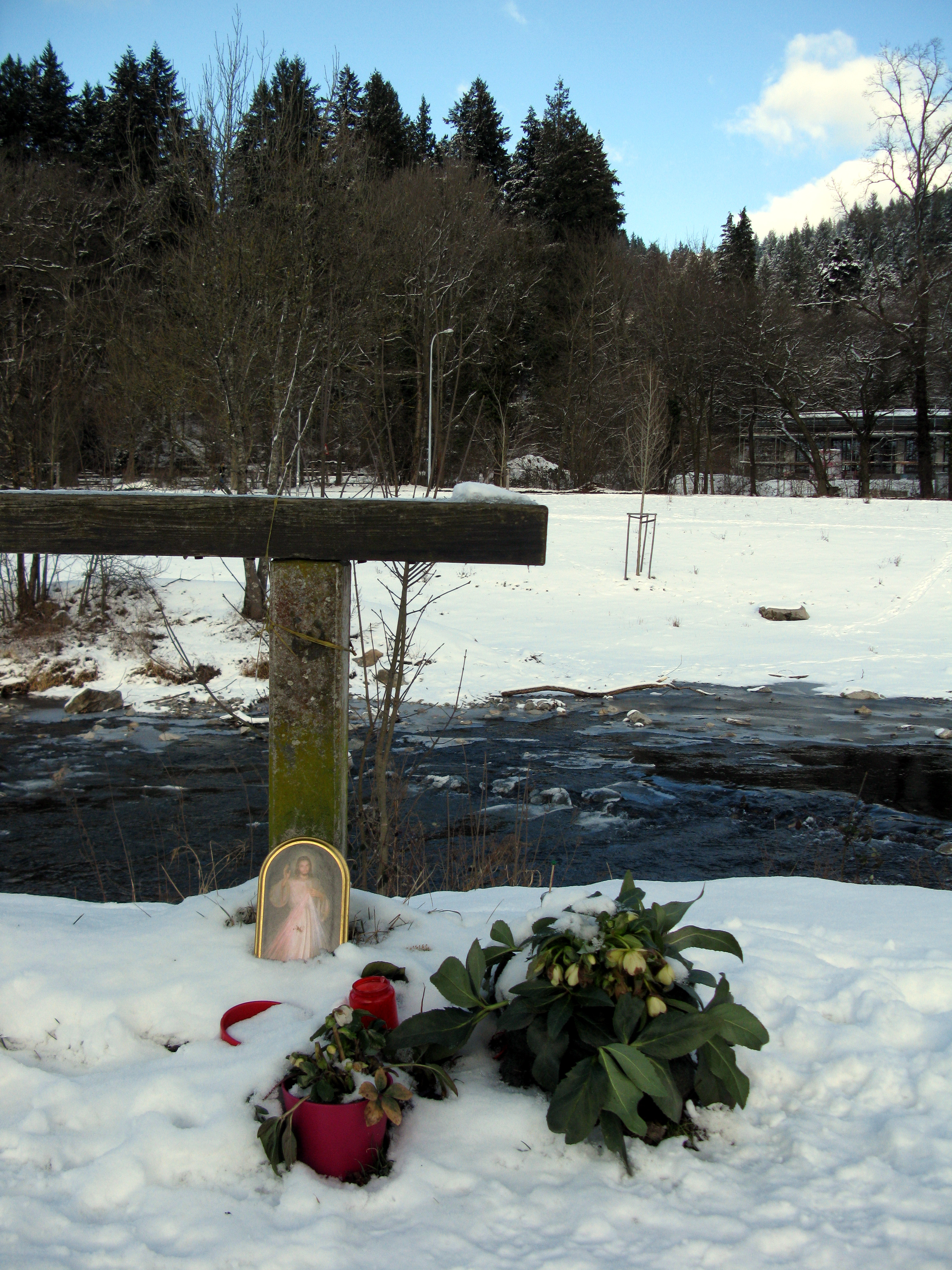
- Flowers at the river Dreisam where the body was found
- Time: 16 October 2016 (aged 19)
- Location: Freiburg im Breisgau, Baden-Württemberg, Germany; 47°59′25″N 7°53′35″E
- Deaths: Maria Ladenburger
- Convicted: Hussein Khavari
- Convictions: Murder, aggravated rape
- Sentence: Life imprisonment

Maria Ladenburger (6 December 1996 – 16 October 2016) was a 19-year-old medical student from Freiburg im Breisgau, Baden-Württemberg, Germany, who was found raped and drowned on 16 October 2016 in the river Dreisam. On 3 December 2016, Freiburg police arrested Hussein Khavari, who had been identified by a hair found at the crime scene, and a CCTV recording from inside a tram. DNA evidence linked him to the crime scene and he was ultimately convicted.

Khavari had entered Germany as a refugee in November 2015, claiming to be from Afghanistan. It was later discovered that he had served a prison term for attempting to rob and murder a girl in Greece before entering Germany. This prompted a discussion about possible failures in European systems of information exchange about refugees and migrants, and any criminal records they may have.

== Crime ==
Maria Ladenburger was a 19-year-old medical student at the University of Freiburg. On the night of 15–16 October 2016, Ladenburger attended a party hosted by the university medical faculty. She left the party at 2:37 a.m. and was returning home by bicycle. She was raped by Khavari on her way near the Schwarzwald-Stadion and died of drowning in the river Dreisam shortly after 3:00 a.m. Khavari later claimed to have choked her with a scarf. A jogger found her body later that morning.

== Investigation ==
Freiburg police formed a special commission consisting of 68 officers, questioned more than 1,400 people, and checked more than 1,600 clues. Khavari was identified by a long strand of hair from a bleached undercut found in the bushes close to the crime scene. A black scarf was also found on the river bed, close to the scene, with traces of Khavari's DNA on it. Based on these findings, he was identified on a CCTV recording taped inside a tram in the vicinity on 17 October. Based on a still from this recording, he was later discovered by a street patrol and arrested. Police announced the arrest during a press conference on 3 December.

The chief of Freiburg's criminal investigation said: "It would be a relief for the parents of the dead" if Khavari would talk about the case. As of the end of December 2016, the accused had refused to speak.

On 5 January 2017, the police requested the public's help in identifying a potentially critical witness. After photos were published, the witness came forward. The witness was considered "important."

According to police, Khavari's iPhone health tracking app provided "crucial evidence" in locating his exact movements while committing the crime.

== Perpetrator ==
Hussein Khavari entered Germany in November 2015 without identification. He claimed to have come from Afghanistan and to have been born in 1999. Khavari's fingerprints had been included in the Europe-wide Eurodac system to which Germany has access since January 2013 when he applied for asylum in Greece. In Germany, because of his claimed age, he was granted asylum as an underage unaccompanied refugee and was placed with a foster family.

Following Khavari's arrest as a suspect for the rape, Stern wrote that in 2014, he had been sentenced to 10 years in prison for robbing a 20-year-old student and throwing her over a cliff in Corfu, Greece, in 2013. The victim survived with heavy injuries. This was confirmed by the suspect's Greek lawyer, and by a fingerprint match. Khavari was released after one and half years in prison due to a general amnesty for juvenile offenders initiated by the Greek government. He violated his probation in Greece by not regularly reporting to a police station and migrated to Germany where German authorities did not find out about his earlier conviction because Greece had not initiated an international search via Interpol.

During the Greek trial in 2014, Khavari told the court that he had been born in 1996, and that he had fled from Iran, both of which conflict with the claims made when he entered Germany.

In February 2017, the public prosecutor stated that a medical investigation had revealed that Khavari was not a minor, but was at least 22 years old at the time of the crime. In March 2017, because of "doubts that could not be dismissed" Khavari was not accused in criminal court, where the penalty for murder could be life in prison, but instead, in juvenile court, where the same crime carries only a maximum 10-year sentence.

=== Trial in Freiburg ===
The trial began in September 2017 and Khavari confessed not only to the rape and murder of Ladenburger but confessed to lying about his age. He was older than he had officially claimed to be. A surveillance video from a Freiburg tram taken on the day of the crime was presented at the trial. The video shows that the accused had molested two other women shortly before the rape and murder of Ladenburger.

According to the testimony of Khavari's cell mate, Khavari had told him that at the age of 14, he had raped a 12-year-old girl in Iran. In addition, the witness said that Khavari had told him that he came from Iran, not from Afghanistan, as Khavari had claimed in Germany. According to a forensic dentist witness, analysis of a tooth of Khavari showed that he was 25 years old, and therefore, not a juvenile. The Iranian father of Khavari told the court via phone, that there was an official document which gave 29 January 1984 as the accused's date of birth.

Psychiatrist Hartmut Pleines said in his report to the court that Khavari was neither schizophrenic nor showed any evidence of brain damage or retarded development, but had a low threshold to violence and a tendency towards manipulative influence, and that his bad character traits were the cause of his criminal behavior, "not a drug-addiction, nor his place of origin or being a Shia Muslim".

Greek policemen, who had been involved in investigating the earlier crime of Khavari in Corfu, testified at the court in Freiburg that the suspect was "indifferent" during the interrogation and once had stated, "that's just a woman."

On 22 March 2018, the Landgericht Freiburg convicted Khavari of aggravated rape and murder and noted a particular severity of guilt. The judges sentenced him to life imprisonment and ordered preventive detention. The chamber applied adult criminal law.

== Reactions ==
The Los Angeles Times reported that the crime remained in the national news in Germany for "several weeks after her body was found."

On 3 October, Martin Jäger, Secretary of State in the Baden-Württemberg Ministry of Interior, sent additional police to Freiburg to increase police presence. Politicians also demanded improved forensic equipment for the Freiburg police for some time. Guido Wolf, Minister of Justice of Baden-Württemberg, called for a change in the code of criminal procedure to allow the police to determine the colour of hair, eyes and skin from a DNA sample. Wolf's desire to change the law triggered a critical response by a group of scholars in an Offener Brief. The scholars argued that the use of forensic DNA phenotyping technology, although not being really precise enough, may have adverse consequences for the individual, the society and the state of law, and that the ethical, legal and social implications should be discussed before using it. They have also formulated a statement on the three current legislative initiatives to expand the use of DNA analyses in criminal investigations.

The mayor of Freiburg, Dieter Salomon (Green Party), stated that the origin of the perpetrator should not be used for sweeping judgments. Sigmar Gabriel (SPD chairman) expressed his condolences, and also warned of incitement to hatred and said that "refugees can commit the same horrifying crimes as people born in Germany". CDU vice-chairwoman, Julia Klöckner, stated that "such cruelties are committed by natives and foreigners, this is no new phenomenon. It's not understandable how a human being can be able to do this." Rainer Wendt, head of the Deutsche Polizeigewerkschaft (German Police Union) said, "this and many more victims would not be, if our country had been prepared for the dangers that are connected to mass immigration." AfD chief Jörg Meuthen said, "We are shocked about this crime, and realize at the same time, that our warnings of the uncontrolled immigration of hundreds of thousands of young men from patriarchal Islamic cultures were depreciated as populism."

ARD's news programme Tagesschau did not report the case in its main edition on 3 December, claiming it was of only "regional significance" and that "the special protection for juveniles" would apply in this case. Public broadcaster ZDF had carried the story. The reasons for not reporting it were subjected to criticism. Stern magazine wrote that they had given an "absurd" explanation for their "ignorance". Two days later, ARD magazine Tagesthemen started to report the case. When chancellor Angela Merkel was questioned about the case during the programme, she stated: "If the fact should prove true that an Afghan refugee is responsible, then we should absolutely condemn this, exactly as in the case of any other murderer, and we should clearly name this." ARD announced their intent to engage a "quality manager" henceforth to deal with the public criticism of their decisions.

On 15 December 2016, the German Minister for the Interior, Thomas de Maizière blamed Greece for not releasing an international arrest warrant in the case. Die Zeit reported in 2016 that Greece had announced "that the fingerprints and personal details of the man had been stored in the European Eurodac system since his arrival in Greece in 2013." The report was confirmed by Welt. Furthermore, Deutsche Welle reported that "this data was available to all European security authorities." Several German politicians, among them Boris Palmer (The Greens) and Thomas Strobl (CDU), Minister of the Interior of Baden-Württemberg, demanded better checks on the age of unaccompanied minors in reaction to reports that the perpetrator was probably not underage. Strobl demanded an examination of the bone age (x-ray of the wrist) to clarify the age of alleged minors. Strobl also demanded common European criminal records.

In 2018, the Süddeutsche Zeitung noted the murder of Maria Ladenburger was included among the list of cases of German women, including Mia Valentin and Mireille B, killed by asylum seekers in social media discussions about refugees from Muslim countries, and the right to asylum and deportations.

== See also ==
- Immigration and crime in Germany
