= Murder of Mireille B =

2018 murder case in Germany

- Time: 12 March 2018 (aged 17)
- Location: Flensburg, Schleswig-Holstein, Germany
- Type: Stabbing
- Deaths: Mireille Bold
- Convicted: Ahmad G
- Convictions: Murder for base motives
- Sentence: Life imprisonment

Mireille Bold, also known as Mireille B., was a 17-year-old German girl who was stabbed to death on 12 March 2018 in her apartment in Flensburg, Schleswig-Holstein (Germany) by her Afghan ex-boyfriend.

== Background ==
=== Relationship ===
The victim and the murderer were both in the care of youth authorities of the municipality (German: Jugendamt), the murderer due to his status as an unaccompanied minor refugee, the victim due to a difficult family situation. Mireille B. and Ahmad S. were a couple on and off for two years in a conflicted relationship. Ahmad S. met Mireille B in early 2016 and began stalking her and tried to control her. According to witnesses, she began wearing an Islamic veil (hijab) although she did not want to. In March 2018 the conflict escalated as Mireille B. refused to wear a hijab and refused to convert to Islam. She ended the relationship and found a new boyfriend.

== Murder ==
In jealousy over Mireille B's new partner, Ahmad S. stabbed her 14 times in the evening of 12 March 2018. Ahmad S. called emergency services at 18:20 and claimed that she had attempted suicide using a knife. Paramedics arrived a few minutes later but were unable to save her life. Paramedics quickly doubted that the victim had inflicted the wounds herself. According to the emergency services, there were no traces of a struggle at the scene. Ahmad S. was taken into custody later the same day.

== Suspect ==
Ahmad S. came to Germany in 2015 as a refugee from Afghanistan. In August 2015, he applied for asylum with the federal police at Hamburg Hauptbahnhof under the name Ahmad M. and claimed to be born in 1998. As an unaccompanied minor, he came into the care of Hamburg youth authorities. While in their care, he entered 1996 as his year of birth and was transferred to a reception facility for adults. He later left Hamburg and in November 2015 applied to a facility for minor refugees in Flensburg and his asylum application was later rejected.

Ahmad S. had narcissistic personality disorder and he showed despair not due to mourning but over losing his control over his ex-girlfriend. He struggled to comprehend that his ex-girlfriend had broken up with him and started a relationship with another man.

== Trial ==
The trial of the suspect took place in the Landgericht of Flensburg and started in September 2018. At the trial Ahmad S. claimed to be 18 years old, born 1999 in Kapisa Province. He could not understand the judge and everything in the courtroom was translated to him by an interpreter; he made use of his right to silence (German: Schweigerecht).

During the trial, the age of the suspect was brought up, as this would determine whether the accused would be tried as a minor or an adult. According to a specialist in forensic medicine having analyzed the suspect, his true age was estimated to be 29. The judge accepted the proof delivered by the specialist and he was tried as an adult.

The defending lawyer entered a plea of innocence on behalf of the accused. In conjunction with the defence lawyer's plea, the accused delivered a statement in his native tongue which was translated by an interpreter.

In February 2019, Ahmad S. was sentenced to life in prison for the murder of his 17-year-old ex-girlfriend.

== Aftermath ==
The murder was noted nationally due to the young age of the victim and the similarities to the murder of Mia Valentin in which an Afghan refugee stabbed his 15-year-old ex-girlfriend to death in Kandel, Rhineland-Palatinate.

Integration advisor Claudia Guenther criticised authorities in Flensburg which apparently had failed to anticipate his true age by not asking Ahmad S. if he had worked before arriving in Germany, as well as failing to realize that he already spoke some German when he arrived at the facility in Flensburg and therefore had likely spent a significant amount of time in the country. Authorities had also not made clear to Ahmad S. that if he gave false information over his birth country or age, it would damage his prospects of a long-term stay in Germany. Guenther also questioned fingerprints and photographs of Ahmad S. from the two asylum applications had not been compared.

The murder of Mireille B was one of several murders of young women and adolescent girls noted by anti-Islamic protesters, including the 2016 murder of Maria Ladenburger in Freiburg, Baden-Württemberg and the murder of Mia Valentin, also by asylum seekers. Outside the building of chancellor Angela Merkel's office in Stralsund, anti-Islamic protesters placed funeral candles together with photos of young women who had been stabbed to death. Chancellor Angela Merkel faced criticism for her 2015 decision to open the borders to masses of mostly Muslim asylum seekers, which in turn led to the rise of the Alternative for Germany (AfD) party, the anti-Islamic Pegida movement and the Identitarian movement.

The murder was noted by Alice Weidel, leader of Alternative for Germany (AfD) in Bundestag, who called the murder "yet another victim of the welcome-culture".
