= Susanne Schröter =

German social anthropologist focused on Islam, gender and conflict

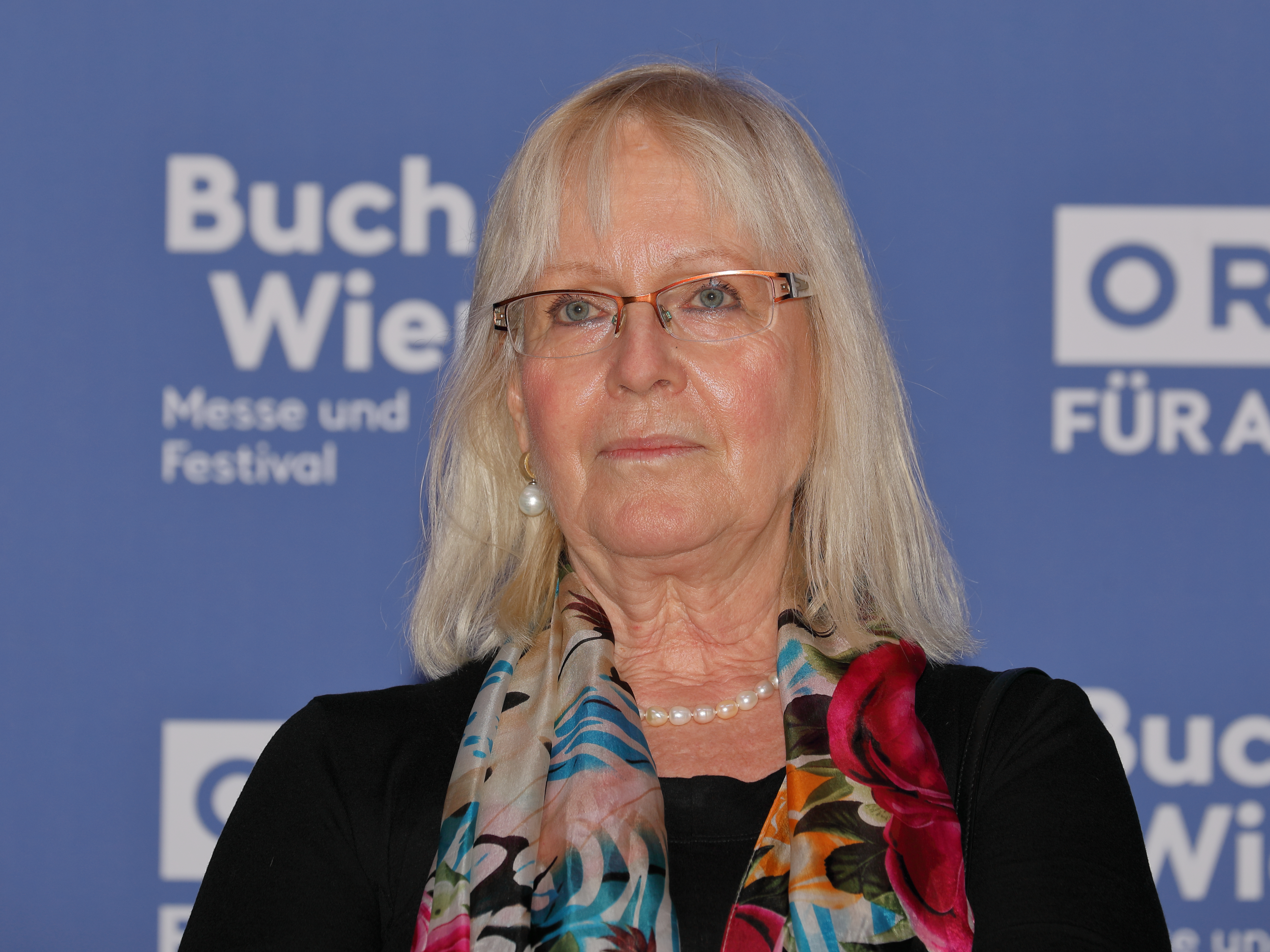
Schröter 2025

Susanne Schröter (born 1957) is a contemporary Social Anthropologist focusing primarily on Islam, Gender and Conflict Studies.

== Biography ==
Susanne Schröter is head of a research group on "Contemporary discourses on state and society in the Islamic world" and carries out a research project founded by the German Research Foundation (DFG) entitled "Re-negotiating gender in contemporary Indonesia. Empowerment strategies of Muslim and secular women activists".

=== 1990s ===
Schröter studied Anthropology, Sociology, Cultural Studies, Political Science and Education at University of Mainz, Germany, she graduated in 1986 (M.A. summa cum laude).

After working as Curator at the Women's Museum, Wiesbaden from 1986 to 1990, she became lecturer at the Department of Anthropology and African Studies, University of Mainz (1991–1996). She was head of the anthropology library and ethnographic collection at the Department of Anthropology and African Studies, University of Mainz from 1993 to 1994. In 1994, she obtained her Ph.D. (magna cum laude) in Anthropology at the University of Mainz with a thesis on the construction of "masculinity" and "femininity" in Melanesia (Dissertation title: "Männliche Selbsterhaltungsstrategien angesichts der Vorstellung omnipotenter Weiblichkeit – Materialien zur Konstruktion von 'Männlichkeit' und 'Weiblichkeit' in Melanesien"). From 1995 to 1997, she was a Research Fellow at the Department of Anthropology and African Studies, University of Mainz. From 1997 to 1999, she worked as a Research Fellow at the Frobenius-Institute, Frankfurt. In 1999, she finalized her Habilitation ("Kéo rado – Die Austreibung des Bösen. Ein Beitrag zur Religion und Sozialstruktur der Ngada in Ostindonesien") and received accreditation as Privatdozentin at Goethe University Frankfurt with a thesis on religion and social structure among the Ngada in East Indonesia. In 1999, she was a visiting professor of anthropology at the Department of Anthropology and African Studies, University of Mainz.

=== 2000s ===
In 2000, she worked as a visiting research fellow at the Department of Anthropology, University of Chicago, and as a visiting professor at the Department of Anthropology, Yale University, New Haven. From 2001 to 2002, she was Visiting Professor of Anthropology at the Institute of Historical Ethnology, Goethe University Frankfurt, and from 2002 to 2004 Research Fellow at the Frobenius Institute, Frankfurt. In 2003, she organized the conference "Christianity in Indonesia. Perspectives of Power" at Goethe University Frankfurt (in Cooperation with Leiden University). In 2004, she worked as a visiting professor at the Doctoral Program "Identity and Difference: Gender Constructions and Interculturality, 18th–21st Centuries" at the University of Trier, as Associate Professor of Anthropology at Goethe University Frankfurt. In 2004, she became professor of Southeast Asian studies at Passau University, where she worked until 2008. In 2005, she organized the conference "Islam and Gender in Southeast Asia" at Passau University, Germany. Since 2008, she is professor of anthropology of colonial and postcolonial orders at the Cluster of Excellence "Formation of Normative Orders", Goethe University Frankfurt (German Universities Excellence Initiative).

In 2023 Schröter was member of the scientific advisory board of the Austrian Documentation Center for Political Islam. In September 2025 she announced the imminent end for the "Frankfurt Research Center on Global Islam" (FFGI). Her own retirement was coming up and the university had modified the job requirements for her replacement, so an expert in latin american studies without expertise in Islamic studies got chosen. Schröter concluded that the university will close the center after her retirement. She believed the "Center on Global Islam" being in contrast to popular Postcolonialist Theories was the driving force behind this development.

== Books ==
- The name of Islam (Im Namen des Islam)

She has studied and criticized the behavior of the radical Muslim minority in Germany and the purpose of this group and has pointed out that she has written the behaviors and actions of this group in the name of Islam.
