= Honor killings by region =

Murders by country and region

An honor killing (American English), honour killing (Commonwealth English), or shame killing is the murder of an individual, either an outsider or a member of a family, by someone seeking to protect what they see as the dignity and honor of themselves or their family. Honor killings are often connected to religion, caste and other forms of hierarchical social stratification, or to sexuality. Most often, it involves the murder of a woman or girl by male family members, due to the perpetrators' belief that the victim has brought dishonor or shame upon the family name, reputation or prestige. Honour killings are believed to have originated from tribal customs. They are prevalent in various parts of the world, it natively happens in the MENA countries and in South Asia especially in India, Pakistan and Nepal. They also occur in immigrant communities in countries which do not otherwise (or historically) have societal norms that encourage honor killings. Honor killings are often associated with rural and tribal areas, but they occur in urban areas too. Although condemned by international conventions and human rights organizations, honor killings are often justified and encouraged by various communities.

== Europe ==
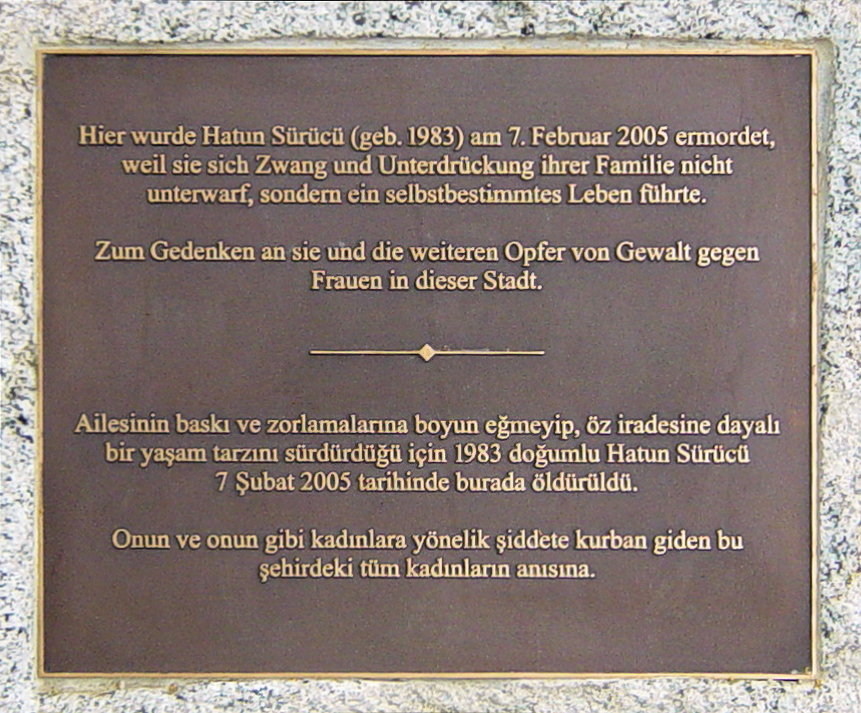
Memorial plaque for Hatun Sürücü in Berlin, Germany. The Turkish woman that was murdered aged 23 by her brothers in an honor killing.

The issue of honor killings has risen to prominence in Europe in recent years, prompting the need to address the occurrence of honor killings. The 2009 European Parliamentary Assembly noted this in their Resolution 1681 which noted the dire need to address honor crimes. The resolution stated that:

On so-called 'honor crimes', the Parliamentary Assembly notes that the problem, far from diminishing, has worsened, including in Europe. It mainly affects women, who are its most frequent victims, both in Europe and the rest of the world, especially in patriarchal and fundamentalist communities and societies. For this reason, it asked the Council of Europe member states to 'draw up and put into effect national action plans to combat violence against women, including violence committed in the name of so-called 'honor', if they have not already done so.

The Honour Based Violence Awareness Network (HBVA) writes:

Certain Eastern European countries have recorded cases of HBV [honor-based violence] within the indigenous populations, such as Albania and Chechnya, and there have been acts of 'honor' killings within living memory within Mediterranean countries such as Italy and Greece.

According to Anthropologist Charles Stewart, the majority of honor killings are committed by first generation migrants against "second and third generation migrants" who have become Westernized.

According to a study investigating 67 honor killings in Europe 1989-2009 by psychologist Phyllis Chesler, published in the Middle East Quarterly journal, 96% of honor murder perpetrators in Europe were Muslim and 68% of victims were tortured before they died.

The Istanbul Convention, the first legally binding international instrument on violence against women, prohibits honor killings. Countries listed in blue on the map are members to this convention, and, as such, have the obligation to outlaw honor killings.

The Council of Europe Convention on preventing and combating violence against women and domestic violence prohibits honor killings. Article 42 reads:

Article 42 – Unacceptable justifications for crimes, including crimes committed in the name of so-called honor

1. Parties shall take the necessary legislative or other measures to ensure that, in criminal proceedings initiated following the commission of any of the acts of violence covered by the scope of this Convention, culture, custom, religion, tradition, or so-called honor shall not be regarded as justification for such acts. This covers, in particular, claims that the victim has transgressed cultural, religious, social, or traditional norms or customs of appropriate behavior.

2. Parties shall take the necessary legislative or other measures to ensure that incitement by any person of a child to commit any of the acts referred to in paragraph 1 shall not diminish the criminal liability of that person for the acts committed.

=== Albania ===
Honor-based violence has a long tradition in Albania, and although it is much rarer today than it was in the past, it still exists. The Kanun is a set of traditional Albanian laws and customs. Honor (in Albanian: Nderi) is one of the four pillars on which the Kanun is based. Honor crimes happen, especially in northern Albania. In Albania (and in other parts of the Balkans), the phenomenon of blood feuds between males was more common historically than honor killings of females, but honor-based violence against women and girls has become more common in recent years.

=== Belgium ===
In 2011, Belgium held its first honor killing trial, in which four Pakistani family members were found guilty of murdering their daughter and sibling, Sadia Sheikh.

As a legacy of the very influential Napoleonic Code, before 1997, Belgian law provided for mitigating circumstances in the case of a killing or an assault against a spouse caught in the act of adultery. Adultery itself was decriminalized in Belgium in 1987.

=== Denmark ===
Ghazala Khan was shot and murdered in Denmark in September 2005 by her brother, after she had married against the will of the family. She was of Pakistani origin. Her murder was ordered by her father to save her family's 'honor' and several relatives were involved. Sentences considered harsh by Danish standards were handed out to all nine accused members of her family, and permanent banishment was ordered for those who were not Danish citizens.

=== Finland ===
The first case of an honor killing in Finland happened in 2015 when an Iraqi man was sentenced to two years in prison for planning to murder his 16-year-old sister. He was also sentenced for assault. He and their mother had forbidden his sister from meeting people her own age and leaving the home beyond going to school.

In 2019, a 48-year-old Iraqi attempted to murder his 40-year-old ex-wife because she was associated with other men. The stabbing was done at an educational institution where both were studying. When she turned around, he stabbed her in the back. She was seriously wounded but survived. According to the accused, he was ridiculed by his friends because the couple had arrived in Finland in 2015 and divorced shortly after arriving.

=== France ===
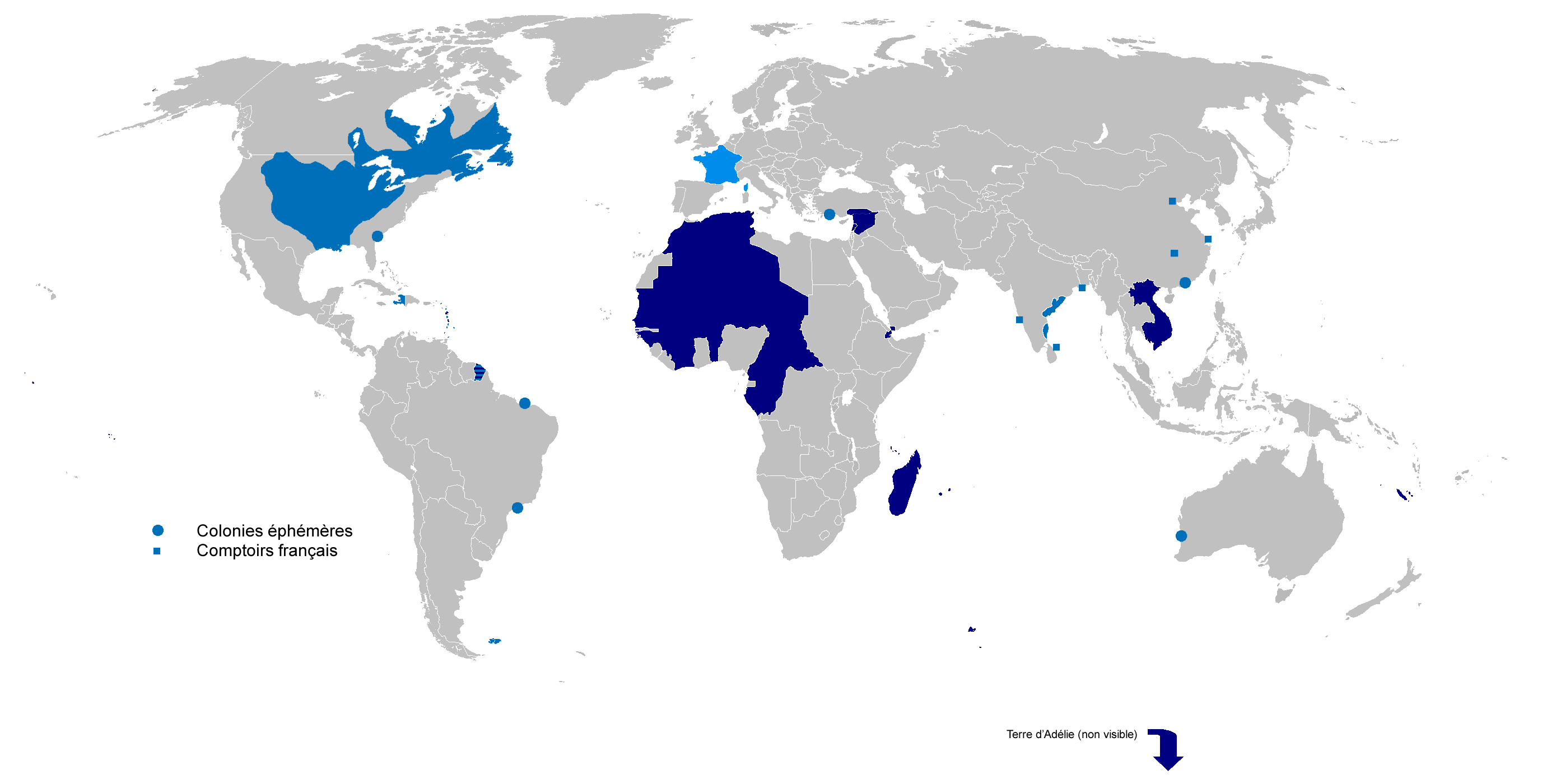
Map showing former territories of the French colonial empire. Jurisdictions in these areas have been legally influenced by the Napoleonic Code of 1804

France has a large immigrant community from North Africa (especially from Algeria, Morocco and Tunisia) and honor-based violence occurs in this community, according to a 1995 article. A 2009 report by the Council of Europe cited the United Kingdom, Germany, Belgium, France, and Norway as countries where honor crimes and honor killings occur.

France traditionally provided for leniency concerning honor crimes, particularly when they were committed against women who had committed adultery. The French Penal Code of 1810, established under Napoleon Bonaparte, is one of the origins of the legal leniency concerning adultery-related killings in a variety of legal systems in several countries around the world. Prior to 1975, the French Penal Code stated at article 324 that "in the case of adultery, provide for by article 336, murder committed upon the wife as well as upon her accomplice, at the moment when the husband shall have caught them in the fact, in the house where the husband and wife dwell, is excusable" [meaning a punishment of 1 to 5 years, according to article 326]. This defense was available only for a husband, not for a wife. Leniency for such crimes in traditional French culture was strongly associated with the literary world of the 19th century which romanticized such homicides; stories about adulterous women, suicides and homicides committed due to 'passion' featured prominently in French literature in the 19th century, and "In literature as in life, unconventional women needed to be severely punished lest their defiant attitudes inspire further acts of rebellion". France also had a strong culture of dueling meant to uphold honor, and France was called by the National Geographic "the dueling capital of Europe".

The Napoleonic Code has been very influential, and many countries, which were former French colonies, or were inspired by French legal norms, enacted laws providing for lesser penalties or even acquittal for such crimes. The 1810 penal code Article 324 passed by Napoleon was copied by Middle Eastern Arab countries. It inspired Jordan's Article 340 which permitted the murder of a wife and her lover if caught in the act at the hands of her husband (today the article provides for mitigating circumstances). France's 1810 Penal Code Article 324 also inspired the 1858 Ottoman Penal Code's Article 188, both the French Article 324 and Ottoman article 188 were drawn on to create Jordan's Article 340 which was retained even after a 1944 revision of Jordan's laws which did not touch public conduct and family law; article 340 still applies to this day in a modified form. France's Mandate over Lebanon resulted in its penal code being imposed there in 1943–1944, with the French-inspired Lebanese law for adultery allowing the mere accusation of adultery against women resulting in a maximum punishment of two years in prison while men have to be caught in the act and not merely accused, and are punished with only one year in prison.

France's Article 324 inspired laws in other Arab countries such as:

- Algeria's 1991 Penal Code Article 279
- Egypt's 1937 Penal Code no. 58 Article 237
- Iraq's 1966 Penal Code Article 409
- Jordan's 1960 Penal Code no. 16 Article 340
- Kuwait's Penal Code Article 153
- Lebanon's Penal Code Articles 193, 252, 253 and 562
  - These were amended in 1983, 1994, 1995, 1996, and 1999 and were eventually repealed by the Lebanese Parliament on 4 August 2011
- Libya's Penal Code Article 375
- Morocco's 1963 amended Penal Code Article 418
- Oman's Penal Code Article 252
- Palestine, which had two codes: Jordan's 1960 Penal Code 1960 in the West Bank and British Mandate Criminal Code Article 18 in the Gaza Strip
  - These were respectively repealed by Article 1 and Article 2 and both by Article 3 of the 2011 Law no. 71 which was signed on 5 May 2011 by president Mahmoud Abbas into the 10 October 2011 Official Gazette no. 91 applying in the Criminal Code of Palestine's Northern Governorates and Southern Governorates
- Syria's 1953 amended 1949 Penal Code Article 548
- Tunisia's 1991 Penal Code Article 207 (which was repealed)
- United Arab Emirate's law no.3/1978 Article 334
- Yemen's law no. 12/1994 Article 232

The Napoleonic Code was also influential in Latin America; Haiti, a former French colony, maintained an honor killing law similar to that of the Napoleonic Code until 2005, when it was repealed. The Napoleonic Code was also influential in the "marry-your-rapist laws" (in force in France until 1994), which were exported to other parts of the world too.

=== Germany ===
External videos
- Hatun Sürücü "honor" Killing in Germany

Investigating criminal records for partner homicides from the years 1996–2005, the German Federal Criminal Police Office concluded that there were about 12 cases of honor killings in Germany per year, including cases involving collective family honor and individual male honor, out of an average about 700 annual homicides. An accompanying study of all homicides in Baden-Württemberg shows that men from Turkey, Yugoslavia, and Albania have a between three and five times overrepresentation for partner homicides, both honor and non-honor-related. The causes for the higher rate were given as low education and social status of these groups along with cultural traditions of violence against women. A 2009 book on honor killings reported that in some cases of honor killing that were brought before German courts, murder charges had been reduced to manslaughter. This has been called the "honor defense".

In 2005 Der Spiegel reported: "In the past four months, six Muslim women living in Berlin have been murdered by family members". The article went on to cover the case of Hatun Sürücü, a Turkish woman who was murdered by her brother for not staying with the husband she was forced to marry, and for "living like a German". Precise statistics on how many women die every year in such honor killings are hard to come by, as many crimes are never reported, said Myria Boehmecke of the Tübingen-based women's group Terre des Femmes. The group tries to protect Muslim girls and women from oppressive families. The Turkish women's organization Papatya has documented 40 instances of honor killings in Germany since 1996. Hatun Sürücü's brother was convicted of murder and jailed for nine years and three months by a German court in 2006. In 2001, Turkish immigrant Mikdat Sacin murdered his 18-year-old daughter Funda Sacin as she refused to marry her cousin from Ankara, Turkey in a forced marriage and secretly married her boyfriend instead. Mikdat S. has fled to his home country Turkey and has yet to come before a court. In 2005, twenty-five-year-old Turkish man Ali Karabey murdered his sister Gönul Karabey for having a German boyfriend. "She disgraced the family", he testified and he felt called upon to punish her with death. He was sentenced to life imprisonment by a German court in 2006.

In 2008, Afghan Morsal Obeidi was murdered by her brother in Hamburg. In 2010, Turkish immigrant and devout Muslim Mehmet Özkan murdered his 15-year-old daughter Büsra Özkan because she refused to live an Islamic lifestyle and would chat with a young man she recently met. In 2016 an Arab woman was shot dead at her wedding in Hannover for allegedly refusing to marry her cousin in a forced marriage.

In 2021, a 34-year-old Afghan woman and mother of two identified solely as Maryam H., was murdered by her two younger brothers. On 13 July, Sayed, 26, and Seyed, 22, lured their sister to a meeting in Berlin before strangling her and slitting her throat. They claimed to have killed her for giving up following Islamic practices, which they said harmed their family's honor. Her dismembered body was found in a suitcase dumped in a shallow grave in near their elder brother's residence in Bavaria, and the brothers were arrested on 3 August. Maryam had been forced into marriage at the age of sixteen. She then fled from Afghanistan to Germany and obtained a divorce. The brothers were charged with murder in December.

=== Italy ===
Similar to other Southern/Mediterranean European areas, honor was traditionally important in Italy. Indeed, until 1981, the Criminal Code provided for mitigating circumstances for such murdering; until 1981 the law read: "Art. 587: He who causes the death of a spouse, daughter, or sister upon discovering her in illegitimate carnal relations and in the heat of passion caused by the offense to his honor or that of his family will be sentenced from three to seven years. The same sentence shall apply to whom, in the above circumstances, causes the death of the person involved in illegitimate carnal relations with his spouse, daughter, or sister." Traditionally, honor crimes used to be more prevalent in Southern Italy.

In 1546, Isabella di Morra, a young poet from Valsinni, Matera, was stabbed to death by her brothers for a suspected affair with a married nobleman, whom they also murdered. In 2006, twenty-year-old Hina Saleem, a Pakistani woman who lived in Brescia, was murdered by her father who claimed he was "saving the family's honor". She had refused an arranged marriage, and was living with her Italian boyfriend. In 2009, in Pordenone, Sanaa Dafani, an 18-year-old girl of Moroccan origin, was murdered by her father because she had a relationship with an Italian man. In 2011, in Cerignola, a man stabbed his brother 19 times because his homosexuality was a "dishonor to the family". In 2021, in Novellara, Saman Abbas was murdered by her uncle because she refused her arranged marriage.

Honor killings have been depicted in Italian popular culture; in the 1961 film Divorce Italian Style the protagonist attempts to manipulate his wife into an extramarital affair, so he can murder her and frame it as an honor killing (thereby receiving a light sentence). In the 2020 television series Mare fuori a character is murdered by his father because of his homosexuality.

=== Norway ===
Between 2000 and 2022, there were 24 murders in Norway that are assumed to have honor killing as a motive, according to a recent (as of 2024) report by Kripos.

Anooshe Sediq Ghulam was a 22-year-old Afghan refugee in Norway, who was murdered by her husband in an honor killing in 2002. She had reported her husband to the police for domestic violence and was seeking a divorce.

=== Sweden ===
The Swedish National Police Board and the Swedish Prosecution Authority define honor-related crime as crimes against a relative who, according to the perpetrator and his family's point of view, has dishonored the family. These crimes are intended to prevent the family from honor being damaged or to restore damaged or lost family honor.

The most serious honor-related crime is often organized and deliberate and not limited to murdering. Incidents include torture, forced suicides, forced marriages, rapes, kidnapping, assault, mortal threats, extortion, and protecting a criminal.

The 26-year-old Turkish woman Fadime Şahindal was murdered by her father in 2002 in Uppsala in Sweden. Kurdish organizations were criticized by prime minister Göran Persson for not doing enough to prevent honor killings. Pela Atroshi was a Kurdish girl who was shot by her uncle in an honor killing in Iraqi Kurdistan. The murder of Pela and Fadime gave rise to the formation of GAPF (the acronym stands for Never Forget Pela and Fadime), a politically and religiously independent and secular nonprofit organization working against honor-related violence and oppression. The organization's name is taken from Pela Atroshi and Fadime Şahindal which are Sweden's best-known and high-profile cases of honor killings.

The honor killing of Sara, an Iraqi Kurdish girl, was the first publicized honor killing in Sweden. Sara was murdered by her brother and cousin when she was 15 years old. According to statements by her mother, Sara's brother believed that she "was a whore who slept with Swedish boys", and that even though he himself also slept with Swedish girls that "was different, because he is a male, and he would not even think of sleeping with Iraqi girls, only with Swedish girls, with whores". These three prominent cases brought the notion of honor killings into Swedish discourse.

In 2016 ten out of the 105 murder cases were honor killings, with 6 female and 4 male victims. The 6 female victims represented a third of the 18 murders of women in Sweden that year.

In May 2019 the court of appeals found a man guilty of murdering his wife in front of the Afghan couple's children who were minors at the time. He was sentenced to life in prison, deportation and a lifetime ban against returning to Sweden.

In December 2020, a 47-year-old Afghan man and his two sons were found guilty by Gällivare district court of honor killing a 20-year-old man together in Kiruna. They suspected that the victim had a relationship with the man's ex-wife.

=== Switzerland ===
In 2010, a 16-year-old Pakistani girl was murdered near Zürich, Switzerland, by her father who was dissatisfied with both her lifestyle and her Christian boyfriend.

In 2014, a forty-two-year-old Syrian Kurd murdered his wife (and cousin) because she had a boyfriend and wanted to live separately. The suspect defended himself by claiming that honor killing is part of Kurdish culture.

=== United Kingdom ===
Every year in the United Kingdom (UK), officials estimates that at least a dozen women died from honour killings, almost exclusively within South Asian and Middle Eastern families. Often, cases cannot be resolved due to the unwillingness of families, relatives and communities to testify. A 2006 BBC poll for the Asian network in the UK found that one in ten of the 500 young Asians polled said that they could condone the killing of someone who had dishonored their families. In the UK, in December 2005, Nazir Afzal, Director, west London, of Britain's Crown Prosecution Service, stated that the United Kingdom has seen "at least a dozen honour killings" between 2004 and 2005.

In 2009, Britain saw a 47% rise in the number of honor-related crimes. Data from police agencies in the UK report 2283 cases in 2010, and an estimated 500 more from jurisdictions that did not provide reports. These "honor-related crimes" also include house arrests and other parental punishments. Most of the attacks were conducted in towns and cities that have significant immigrant populations.

In addition to Asian and Middle Eastern families had found the presence of shame culture and abuse within the name of honour also being practiced within the Travelling and Roma community.

One of the earliest prosecuted cases in the UK was that of 19-year-old Rukhsana Naz, who was forced to marry her second cousin from Pakistan at age 15. She embarked on an affair with the man she had really wanted to marry, fell pregnant and was murdered by her brother with the aid of her mother for refusing to terminate her pregnancy and remain in her forced marriage.

Chomir Ali, a British-Bangladeshi man, conspired with his two teenaged sons to murder Arash Ghorbani-Zarin, a 19-year-old British Iranian man who was in a relationship with his daughter. Ali was reportedly angered by their relationship because had already arranged her marriage to another man.

Banaz Mahmod, a 20-year-old Iraqi Kurdish woman from Mitcham, south London, was murdered in 2006, in a murder orchestrated by her father, uncle and cousins. Her life and murder were presented in a documentary called Banaz: A Love Story, directed and produced by Deeyah Khan. The investigation into her disappearance and murder was dramatised in the 2020, two-part ITV mini-series, Honour, starring Keeley Hawes.

Another well-known case was Heshu Yones, stabbed to death by her Kurdish father in London in 2002, because he thought she'd become too "westernized" and was involved in a relationship of which he didn't approve. Other examples include the killing of Tulay Goren, a Kurdish Shia Muslim girl who immigrated with her family from Turkey, and Samaira Nazir (Pakistani Muslim).

A highly publicized case was that of Shafilea Iftikhar Ahmed, a 17-year-old British Pakistani girl from Great Sankey, Warrington, Cheshire, who was murdered in 2003 by her parents. However, a lesser-known case is that of Gurmeet Singh Ubhi, a Sikh man who, in February 2011, was found guilty of the murder of his 24-year-old daughter, Amrit Kaur Ubhi in 2010. Ubhi was found to have murdered his daughter because he disapproved of her being "too westernized". Likewise, he also disapproved of the fact that she was dating a non-Sikh man.

In 2012, the UK had the first white victim of an honor killing: 17-year-old Laura Wilson was murdered by her Asian boyfriend, Ashtiaq Ashgar, because she revealed details of their relationship to his family, challenging traditional cultural values of the Asian family. Laura Wilson's mother said, "I honestly think it was an honour killing for putting shame on the family. They needed to shut Laura up and they did." Wilson was repeatedly knifed to death as she walked along a canal in Rotherham.

In 2013, Mohammed Inayat was jailed for murdering his wife and injuring three daughters by setting his house on fire in Birmingham. Inayat wanted to stop his daughter from flying to Dubai to marry her boyfriend, because he believed the marriage would dishonor his family.

In 2013, the husband of Syrian-born 25-year-old Rania Alayed was jailed for her murder. His two brothers were also jailed for perverting the course of justice in relation to the disposal of her body, which has never been found. According to the prosecution, the motive for the murder was that she had become "too westernised" and was "establishing an independent life".

In August 2025, Labour Party, who is in the government right now, had its ministers announcing a clear legislation that clearly discusses and defines so-called honour-based violence. The amendment was made to catch more predators and to protect more victims, especially women and girls. This amendment was proposed to enhance the way public services respond to honour attacks in England and Wales, and forms part of Labour’s plan for change, which includes a pledge to halve violence against women and girls; legislation defining this cultural phenonemon was passed by the Executive under the Crime and Policing Act 2026 in February 2026.

== Middle East and North Africa ==
Honor killings in Maghreb are not as common as in the Middle East and South Asia, but they do occur. In Libya, it can also be committed against rape victims.

In a poll with respondents across countries in the Arab world such as Algeria (27%), Morocco (25%), Sudan (14%), Jordan (21%), Tunisia (8%), Lebanon (8%), and the Palestinian territory of the West Bank (8%), it was found that honor killings were more acceptable than homosexuality.

=== Egypt ===
Honor killings in Egypt can occur due to reasons such as a woman meeting an unrelated man, even if this is only an allegation; or adultery (real or suspected). The exact number of honor killings is not known, but a report in 1995 estimated about 52 honor killings that year. In 2013, a woman and her two daughters were murdered by 10 male relatives, who strangled and beat them, and then threw their bodies in the Nile. Five of the ten men were arrested as a result.

=== Iran ===
In Iran, there have been a number of recorded cases of honor killings that made international headlines.

In May 2021, a London-based filmmaker, 46-year-old Babak Khorramdin was stabbed to death by his 74 year old mother, Iran Khorramdin and 81 year old father, Akbar Khorramdin in the middle of an argument after they found out that their son is still single at this age and that he doesn't want to be married. After the murder, Khorramdin's body was mutilated, chopped into pieces and were put in three separate bags. Furthermore, the same couple had also killed Babak's sister and brother-in-law prior to his death. The parents accused their son of harassment and for making an attempt to ruin their reputation. Furthermore, they stated that they "were proud" and "showed no remorse".

In February 2022 a video circulated in Iran of a man (Sajjad Heydari), in Ahvaz, Khuzestan in Western Iran, smiling and carrying the severed head of his 17 year old wife (Mona Heydari). The IRNA news agency referred to the incident as the result of an "honor killing." The wife had fled to Turkey but was brought back to Iran and killed shortly after. According to human rights lawyer Yonah Diamond, "the Iranian authorities enabled the barbaric beheading of Mona Heydari -- a child bride -- for seeking a divorce from a violently abusive marriage..."

Two years earlier another high-profile "honor killing" involved a 14-year-old who was allegedly killed with a sickle by her father in northern Iran's Talesh County, after she ran away from her family home with a 29-year-old man.

According to the medical journal The Lancet, there were at least 8,000 honor killings in Iran between 2010 and 2014, of which only a few were reported.

Article 630 of the Constitution exempts a husband from punishment if he murders his wife for committing adultery.

Iran International reports that about 60 women have fallen victim to honor killings from 2020 to 2021, according to a women's right NGO in Ahvaz, "including some who were 10 or 15 years old. None of the perpetrators have been brought to justice" and few of the families have even filed a lawsuit.

==== Notable honor killings ====
The following is a list of notable honor killings in Iran:

Date	Victim	Ref.
May 2020	Romina Ashrafi	
May 2021	Ali Fazeli Monfared	
May 2021	Babak Khorramdin	
February 2022	Mona Heydari	
August 2024	Mobina Zeynivand	
January 2025	Kani Abdollahi	
January 2025	Atefeh Zaghibi	
April 16, 2025	Fatemeh Soltani	

=== Iraq ===
In 2008, the United Nations Assistance Mission for Iraq (UNAMI) has stated that honor killings are a serious concern in Iraq, particularly well documented in Iraqi Kurdistan. There are conflicting estimates on the number of honor killings in Iraqi Kurdistan. The Free Women's Organization of Kurdistan (FWOK) released a statement on International Women's Day 2015 noting that "6,082 women were killed or forced to commit suicide during the past year in Iraqi Kurdistan, which is almost equal to the number of the Peshmerga martyred fighting Islamic State (IS)," and that a large number of women were victims of honor killings or enforced suicide—mostly self-immolation or hanging. According to Zhin Woman magazine, published in December 2015 in Sulaimaniya, from January to August 2015, in the three main Kurdish provinces of Sulaimaniya, Erbil, and Duhok, there were a total of 122 cases of honor killings and 124 women's suicides. According to KRG Ministry of Interior's Directorate-General of Countering Violence Committed Against Women, only 14 women were victims of "so-called" honor killings in 2017. The practice is reportedly declining due to increased numbers of women's rights organizations and government initiatives. About 500 honor killings per year are reported in hospitals in Iraqi Kurdistan, although real numbers are likely higher. It is speculated that alone in Erbil there is one honor killing per day. The UNAMI reported that at least 534 honor killings occurred between January and April 2006 in the Kurdish Governorates. It is claimed that many deaths are reported as "female suicides" in order to conceal honor-related crimes. Aso Kamal of the Doaa Network Against Violence claimed that they have estimated that there were more than 12,000 honor killings in Iraqi Kurdistan from 1991 to 2007. He also said that the government figures are much lower, and show a decline in recent years, and Kurdish law has mandated since 2008 that an honor killing be treated like any other murder. Honor killings and other forms of violence against women have increased since the creation of Iraqi Kurdistan, and "both the KDP and PUK claimed that women's oppression, including 'honor killings', are part of Kurdish 'tribal and Islamic culture'" The honor killing and self-immolation condoned or tolerated by the Kurdish administration in Iraqi Kurdistan has been labeled as "gendercide" by Mojab (2003).

As many as 133 women were murdered in the Iraqi city of Basra alone in 2006. Seventy-nine were murdered for violation of "Islamic teachings" and 47 for honor, according to IRIN, the news branch of the U.N.'s Office for the Coordination of Humanitarian Affairs. Amnesty International says that armed groups, not the government, also kill politically active women and those who did not follow a strict dress code, as well as women who are perceived as human rights defenders. Seventeen-year-old Du'a Khalil Aswad, an Iraqi girl of the Yazidi faith, was stoned to death in front of a mob of about 2,000 men in 2007, possibly because she was allegedly planning to convert to Islam. A video of the brutal incident was released on the Internet. According to the crowd she had "shamed herself and her family" for failing to return home one night and there were suspicions of her converting to Islam to marry her boyfriend, who was in hiding in fear of his own safety.

In February 2023, 22-year-old Tiba Al-Ali was murdered by her father in her sleep overnight as punishment for being independent by remaining in Turkey with her Syrian fiance. She initially stayed from home because a family member sexually abused her.

In May 2026, a 15 year old girl named Kawthar Bashar Al-Husayjawi was killed by her birth family for refusing to marry her older alcoholic cousin in her home in the town of Al-Nahrawan in the southeast of Baghdad; family members praised her killers. History showed that she was taken of from school aged 13 and was subjected to physical and emotional harm prior to her marriage. She initially filed for a divorce from her abusive cousin in December 2025.

=== Israel ===
According to Aida Touma-Suleiman the subject of ‘honor crimes’ was a taboo among Arabs in Israel until protests in the 1990s by the Israeli Palestinian feminist women's groups Al-Fanar and al-Badeel forced open discussion within Arab society. Although there reportedly exist safe houses for women and girls at risk, the Israel police, social work and court authorities have not always utilized such shelters. In 2005, Suleiman's Nazareth-based Women Against Violence organization indicated that an average of 10 Arab women are victims of honor killings annually in Israel.

In July 2017, a 17-year-old Arab Christian girl, Henriette Kara, was murdered by her father for converting to Islam to marry her Muslim boyfriend. In 2023, Sarit Ahmad, an 18-year-old Druze lesbian from Kisra-Sumei, was murdered by hitmen her 29-year-old brother had hired.

=== Jordan ===
A 2008 report of the National Council of Family Affairs in Jordan, an NGO affiliated with the Queen of Jordan, indicated that the National Forensic Medicine Center recorded 120 murdered women in 2006, with 18 cases classified officially as crimes of honor. In 2013, the BBC cited estimates by the National Council of Family Affairs in Jordan, an NGO, that as many as 50 Jordanian women and girls had been murdered in the preceding 13 years. But the BBC indicated "the real figure" was probably "far higher," because "most honor killings go unreported."

Men used to receive reduced sentences for killing their wives or female family members if they are deemed to have brought dishonor to their family. Families often get sons under the age of 16—legally minors—to commit honor killings; the juvenile law allows convicted minors to serve time in a juvenile detention center and be released with a clean criminal record at the age of 16. Rana Husseini, a leading journalist on the topic of honor killings, states that "under the existing law, people found guilty of committing honor killings often receive sentences as light as six months in prison". According to UNICEF, there are an average of 23 honor killings per year in Jordan.

On 1 August 2017, article 98 in the penal codes were amended to exclude honor criminals from receiving lenient punishments for being in "a state of great fury". However, article 340 which sees reduced penalties when a man attacks or kills a female relative having found her in the act of "adultery", is still in effect.

A 2013 survey of "856 ninth-graders—average age of 15—from a range of secondary schools across Amman—including private and state, mixed-sex and single-gender" showed that attitudes favoring honor killings are present in the "next generation" Jordanians: "In total, 33.4% of all respondents either "agreed" or "strongly agreed" with situations depicting honor killings. Boys were more than twice as likely to support honor killings: 46.1% of boys and 22.1% of girls agreed with at least two honor killing situations in the questionnaire." The parents' education was found to be a significant correlation: "61% of teenagers from the lowest level of educational background showed supportive attitudes towards honor killing, as opposed to only 21.1% where at least one family member has a university degree."

=== Kuwait ===
Honor killings in Kuwait are rare, but not unheard of—in 2006 a young woman was murdered in an honor killing committed by her brothers. In 2008, a girl was given police protection after reporting that her family intended to murder her for having an affair with a man.

=== Lebanon ===
There are no exact official numbers about honor killings of women in Lebanon; many honor killings are arranged to look like accidents, but the figure is believed to be 40 to 50 per year. A 2007 report by Amnesty International said that the Lebanese media in 2001 reported 2 or 3 honor killings per month in Lebanon, although the number is believed to be higher by other independent sources.

On 4 August 2011, however, the Lebanese Parliament agreed by a majority to abolish Article 562, which for the past years had worked as an excuse to commute the sentence given for honor killing.

=== Palestine ===
In 2005, 22-year-old Faten Habash, a Christian from West Bank, was said to have dishonored her family by falling for a young Muslim man, Samer. Following their thwarted attempts to elope to Jordan, she suffered her relatives' wrath after rejecting the options of either marrying her cousin or becoming a nun in Rome. She had spent a period of time in hospital recovering from a broken pelvis and various other injuries caused by an earlier beating by her father and other family members. Still fearing her family after her release from the hospital, she approached a powerful Bedouin tribe, which took her under its care. Her father then wept and gave his word that he would not harm her. She returned to him, only to be bludgeoned to death with an iron bar days later.

In 2005, Yusra al-Azami, a Gaza student, was shot dead, and her fiancé and future brother-in-law were beaten by Hamas members, allegedly belonging to a group "combating vice and promoting virtue". Mushira Masri, a Hamas spokesman, later said the gunmen did not know the couples were engaged: "The brothers who did this made a mistake. There was suspicion of immoral behavior." A week after the murder, a sharia arbitration committee was formed and the families of the murderers and the victims came to an agreement.

The Palestinian Authority, using a clause in the Jordanian penal code still in effect in the West Bank as of 2011, exempted men from punishment for killing a female relative if she has brought dishonor to the family. The Palestinian Independent Commission for Human Rights has reported 29 women were murdered 2007–2010, whereas 13 women were murdered in 2011 and 12 in the first seven months of 2012. According to a PA Ministry of Women's Affairs report the rate of 'Honor Killings' went up by 100% in 2013, "reporting the number of 'honor killing' victims for 2013 at 27".

Mahmoud Abbas, president of the Palestinian Authority, issued a decree in May 2014 under which the exemption of men was abolished in cases of honor killings.

The death of Israa Ghrayeb took place on 22 August 2019 in the Palestinian city of Bethlehem. Israa Ghrayeb, 21 years old, was reportedly beaten to death by her brother because she posted a selfie with her partner a day before they were supposed to get engaged.

=== Saudi Arabia ===
In 2008 a woman was murdered in Saudi Arabia by her father for "chatting" with a man on Facebook. The murder became public when a Saudi cleric referred to the case, to criticize Facebook for the strife it caused.

The 1980 film Death of a Princess implies that the execution of Princess Misha'al in 1977 was actually an honor killing, rather than a sentence handed down by a court.

=== Syria ===
Some estimates suggest that more than 200 honor killings occur every year in Syria. The Syrian civil war has been reported as leading to an increase in honor killings in the country, mainly due to the common occurrence of war rape, which led to the stigmatization of victims by their relatives and communities, and in turn to honor killings.

=== Turkey ===
A report compiled by the Council of Europe estimated that over 200 women were murdered in honor killings in Turkey in 2007. A June 2008 report by the Turkish Prime Ministry's Human Rights Directorate said that in Istanbul alone there was one honor killing every week, and reported over 1,000 during the previous five years. It added that metropolitan cities were the location of many of these, due to growing immigration to these cities from the East. The mass migration during the past decades of rural population from Southeastern Turkey to big cities in Western Turkey has resulted in relatively more developed cities such as Istanbul, Ankara, Izmir, and Bursa having the highest numbers of reported honor killings.

A report by UNFPA identified the following situations as being common triggers for honor killings: a married woman having an extra-marital relationship; a married woman running away with a man; a married woman getting separated or divorced; a divorced woman having a relationship with another man; a young unmarried girl having a relationship; a young unmarried girl running away with a man; a woman (married or unmarried) being kidnapped and/or raped.

In Turkey, young boys are often ordered by other family members to commit the honor killing, so that they can get a shorter jail sentence (because they are minors). Forced suicides—where the victim who is deemed to have 'dishonored' the family is ordered to commit suicide in an attempt by the perpetrator to avoid legal consequences—also take place in Turkey, especially in Batman in southeastern Turkey, which has been nicknamed "Suicide City".

In 2009 a Turkish news agency reported that a 2-day-old boy who was born out of wedlock had been murdered for honor in Istanbul. The maternal grandmother of the infant, along with six other persons, including a doctor who had reportedly accepted a bribe to not report the birth, were arrested. The grandmother is suspected of fatally suffocating the infant. The child's mother, 25, was also arrested; she stated that her family had decided to kill the child.

In 2010 a 16-year-old girl was buried alive by relatives for befriending boys in Southeast Turkey; her corpse was found 40 days after she went missing.

Honor killings continue to receive some support in the conservative regions of Turkey. In 2005, a small survey in Diyarbakir in southeastern Turkey found that, when asked the appropriate punishment for a woman who has committed adultery, 37% of respondents said she should be killed, while 21% said her nose or ears should be cut off. A July 2008 Turkish study by a team from Dicle University on honor killings in the Southeastern Anatolia Region, the predominantly Kurdish area of Turkey, has so far shown that little if any social stigma is attached to honor killing. It also comments that the practice is not related to a feudal societal structure, "there are also perpetrators who are well-educated university graduates. Of all those surveyed, 60 percent are either high school or university graduates or at the very least, literate." There are well-documented cases, where Turkish courts have sentenced whole families to life imprisonment for an honor killing. The most recent was on 13 January 2009, where a Turkish court sentenced five members of the same Kurdish family to life imprisonment for the honor killing of Naile Erdas, a 16-year-old girl who got pregnant as a result of rape.

Honor killings also affect gay people. In 2008 a man had to flee from Turkey after his Kurdish boyfriend was killed by his own father. Ahmet Yıldız, 26, a Turkish-Kurdish physics student who represented his country at an international gay conference in the United States in 2008, was shot dead leaving a cafe in Istanbul. Yıldız, who came from a deeply religious family was believed to have been the victim of the country's first gay honor killing.

=== Yemen ===
Honor killings are common in Yemen. In some parts of the country, traditional tribal customs forbid contact between men and women before marriage. Yemeni society is strongly male dominated, Yemen being ranked last of 135 countries in the 2012 Global Gender Gap Report. It was estimated that in 1997 about 400 women and girls died in honor killings in Yemen. In 2013, a 15-year-old girl was killed by her father, who burned her to death, because she talked to her fiancé before the wedding.

== South Asia ==
=== Afghanistan ===
In 2012, Afghanistan recorded 240 cases of honor killings, but the total number is believed to be much higher. Of the reported honor killings, 21% were committed by the victims' husbands, 7% by their brothers, 4% by their fathers, and the rest by other relatives.

In May 2017, United Nations Assistance Mission in Afghanistan concluded that the vast majority of cases involving honor killings and murders of women, perpetrators were not punished. Of the 280 recorded cases in the January 2016-December 2017 time span, 50 cases ended in a conviction. UNAMA concluded that the vast majority offences could be committed with impunity.

=== India ===
Honour killings have been reported in northern regions of India, mainly in the Indian states of Punjab, Rajasthan, Haryana, Uttar Pradesh, and the southern state of Tamil Nadu. The main reason for these crimes is a result of people marrying without their family's acceptance, especially when it is between members of two different castes or religious groups, or, more particular to northwestern India, between members of the same gotra, or exogamous clan. In contrast, honour killings are less prevalent but are not completely non-existent in the western Indian states of Maharashtra and Gujarat. honour killings are reflected in nationwide data from the National Crime Records Bureau. That data showed 251 honour killings in 2015, though activists considered that a significant undercount. The same records bureau reported only 24 honour killings in 2019. According to a survey by AIDWA, over 30 percent of honour killings in the country take place in Western Uttar Pradesh. In some other parts of India, notably West Bengal, honour killings completely ceased about a century ago, largely due to the activism and influence of reformists such as Vivekananda, Ramakrishna, Vidyasagar and Raja Ram Mohan Roy.

Haryana has had many incidents of honour killings, mainly among Meenas, Rajputs and Jats. The role of khap panchayats (caste councils of village elders) has been questioned. Madhu Kishwar, a professor at Centre for the Study of Developing Societies, claims that only 2% to 3% honour killings are related to gotra killings by the khap or caste panchayats, rest are done by the families. "Will you ban families? There are plenty of tyrannical police officials, plenty of incompetent and corrupt judges in India who pass very retrogressive judgments, but no one says ban the police and the law courts. By what right do they demand a ban on khaps, simply because some members have undemocratic views? Educated elite in India don't know anything about the vital role played by these age-old institutions of self-governance." In March 2010, Karnal district court ordered the execution of five perpetrators of an honour killing and imprisoning for life the khap (local caste-based council) chief who ordered the killings of Manoj Banwala (23) and Babli (19), a man and woman of the same gotra who eloped and married in June 2007. Despite having been given police protection on court orders, they were kidnapped; their mutilated bodies were found a week later in an irrigation canal. In 2013, a young couple who were planning to marry were murdered in Garnauthi village, Haryana, due to having a love affair. The woman, Nidhi, was beaten to death and the man, Dharmender, was dismembered alive. People in the village and neighbouring villages approved of the killings.

The Indian state of Punjab also has a large number of honour killings. According to data compiled by the Punjab Police, 34 honour killings were reported in the state between 2008 and 2010: 10 in 2008, 20 in 2009, and four in 2010. Bhagalpur in the eastern Indian state of Bihar has also been notorious for honour killings. Jagir Kaur a prominent Sikh leader and six others were charged with causing the miscarriage and death of Kaur's daughter in 2000. Kaur was sentenced to 5 years for conspiracy but was acquitted on appeal in 2018 and the case awaits hearing at the Supreme Court. Recent cases include a 16-year-old girl, Imrana, from Bhojpur who was set on fire inside her house in a case of what the police called 'moral vigilantism'. The victim had screamed for help for about 20 minutes before neighbors arrived, only to find her smoldering body. She was admitted to a local hospital, where she later died from her injuries. In May 2008, Jayvirsingh Bhadodiya shot his daughter Vandana Bhadodiya and struck her on the head with an axe. honour killings occur even in Delhi.

Honour killings take place in Rajasthan, too. In June 2012, a man chopped off his 20-year-old daughter's head with a sword in Rajasthan after learning that she was dating men. According to police officer, "Omkar Singh told the police that his daughter Manju had relations with several men. He had asked her to mend her ways several times in the past. However, she did not pay heed. Out of pure rage, he chopped off her head with the sword".

In 1990, the National Commission for Women set up a statutory body to address the issues of honour killings among some ethnic groups in North India. This body reviewed constitutional, legal, and other provisions as well as challenges women face. The NCW's activism has contributed significantly towards the reduction of honour killings in rural areas of North India.

In June 2010, scrutinizing the increasing number of honour killings, the Supreme Court of India demanded responses about honour killing prevention from the federal government and the state governments of Punjab, Haryana, Bihar, Uttar Pradesh, Rajasthan, Jharkhand, Himachal Pradesh, and Madhya Pradesh.

Alarmed by the rise of honour killings, the Government planned to bring a bill in the Monsoon Session of Parliament July 2010 to provide for deterrent punishment for 'honour' killings.

In 2000, Jaswinder Kaur Sidhu (nicknamed Jassi), a Canadian Punjabi who married rickshaw driver Sukhwinder Singh Sidhu (nicknamed Mithu) against her family's wishes, was brutally murdered in India following orders from her mother and uncle in Canada so that "the family honour was restored". Her body was found in an irrigation canal. Mithu was kidnapped, beaten and left to die, but survived.

Tamil Nadu has had 192 cases of honour killings, most relating to marriages between a woman higher in the caste hierarchy than the man she marries. These marriages in particular are considered "dishonourable" since the women of the caste are responsible for its continuation, by having children. According to Kathir of the anti-caste group Evidence, "There is this firm belief that if I get my daughter married to someone of my own caste, I have succeeded in safeguarding it. And if not, one's prestige is challenged, and then there is barbaric anger". In 2016, Chinnaswamy, a member of the Thevar community dominant in the southern part of the state, ordered the killing of his daughter Kausalya and her husband Shankar, belonging to the Dalit Pallar community. The crime, taking place at Udumalaipettai Bus station, was caught on video with Shankar hacked to death in broad daylight, while his wife barely escaped alive. The accused in the case were at first sentenced to death, but later Chinnaswamy was ruled "not guilty" and the other killer's sentences were reduced.

In 2018, there were two honour killings in Kerala, one related to an inter-caste marriage.

=== Nepal ===
Honor killings have been reported in Nepal, with much of them linked with the caste system that is deeply rooted in Nepalese tradition. Most honor killings are reportedly undetected. Gender-based violence has been the deadliest form of violence in Nepal as of 2017, which includes honor killings and has been rising in the country as of 2012.

=== Pakistan ===
In Pakistan honor killings are known locally as karo-kari. An Amnesty International report noted "the failure of the authorities to prevent these killings by investigating and punishing the perpetrators." Official data put the number of women killed in honor killings in 2015 at nearly 1,100. Recent cases include that of three teenage girls who were buried alive after refusing arranged marriages. Another case was that of Taslim Khatoon Solangi, 17, of Hajna Shah village in Khairpur district, which was widely reported after her father, 57-year-old Gul Sher Solangi, publicized the case. He alleged his eight-months-pregnant daughter was tortured and killed on 7 March on the orders of her father-in-law, who accused her of carrying a child conceived out of wedlock. Statistically, honor killings have a high level of support in Pakistan's rural society, despite widespread condemnation from human rights groups. In 2002 alone over 382 people, about 245 women and 137 men, became victims of honor killings in the Sindh province of Pakistan. Over the course of six years, more than 4,000 women have died as victims of honor killings in Pakistan from 1999 to 2004. In 2005 the average annual number of honor killings for the whole nation was stated to be more than 1,000 per year.

A 2009 study by Muazzam Nasrullah et al. reported a total of 1,957 honor crime victims reported in Pakistan's newspapers from 2004 to 2007. Of those killed, 18% were below the age of 18 years, and 88% were married. Husbands, brothers, and close relatives were direct perpetrators of 79% of the honor crimes reported by mainstream media. The method used for honor crime included firearms (most common), stabbing, axe, and strangulation.

According to women's rights advocates, "the concepts of women as property, and of honor, are so deeply entrenched in the social, political and economic fabric of Pakistan that the government mostly ignores the regular occurrences of women being killed and maimed by their families." Frequently, women killed in honor killings are recorded as having committed suicide or died in accidents. Savitri Goonesekere states that tribal leaders in Pakistan use religious justifications for sanctioning honor killings.

On 27 May 2014, a pregnant woman was stoned to death by her own family in front of a Pakistani high court for marrying the man she loved. "I killed my daughter as she had insulted all of our family by marrying a man without our consent, and I have no regret over it," the father reportedly told the police investigator. Prime Minister Nawaz Sharif described the stoning as "totally unacceptable," and ordered the chief minister of Punjab province to provide an immediate report. He demanded to know why police did nothing, despite the killing taking place outside one of the country's top courts, in the presence of police. Scholars suggest that the Islamic law doctrine of Qisas and Diyya encourages honor killings, particularly against females, as well as allows the murderer to go unpunished. However it has been pointed out that criminals can still be punished under tazir or fasad doctrine which is often ignored by judges sympathetic to killers. In 2016, Pakistan repealed the loophole which allowed the perpetrators of honor killings to avoid punishment by seeking forgiveness for the crime from another family member, and thus be legally pardoned.

In January 2017 a Pakistani mother was sentenced to death for killing her daughter that had married against her family's wishes. On 14 May 2020, two women in North Waziristan province of Pakistan were murdered and buried by their family members in an act of honor killing, after a video of the women kissing a man circulated on social media platforms.

=== Bangladesh ===
Cases of honour killings are relatively rare in Bangladesh as opposed to its neighbouring countries, but they are not unheard of. In 2020, a 16 year old girl was killed by her father, uncle and brothers in Brahmanbaria for befriending boys. In 2023, Kuddus Mia was arrested for the 2015 honor killing of his then-10th daughter, who had eloped with her husband.

Some organizations also report that such incidents have mostly happened and at higher risk of happening among the diaspora.

== East Asia ==
Honor killing is rare in modern East Asia. Only one case in China is considered by some as an honor killing. On 15 April 2017, Ma Ruibao, a Hui resident of Zhongning County in Ningxia, murdered his daughter, her boyfriend surnamed Li and the taxi driver who drove the couple home. Ma Ruibao confessed that he murdered his daughter and Li on April 15 because he was not "satisfied" with Li. Though some civilian speculators believed it to be an honor killing, Ding Liyu, a police officer from the Qingtongxia police bureau, said he did not know what an honor killing is and why it has anything to do with the murder.

== Southeast Asia ==
=== Indonesia ===
Honor killings are very rare in Indonesia. However, in 2020, a 16-year-old schoolgirl, Rosmini binte Darwis was beaten and hacked to death by her two brothers.

== The Americas ==
=== Canada ===
Honour killings have become such a pressing issue in Canada that the Canadian citizenship study guide mentions it specifically, saying, "Canada's openness and generosity do not extend to barbaric cultural practices that tolerate spousal abuse, 'honour killings', female genital mutilation, forced marriage or other gender-based violence."

Canada has been host to a number of high-profile killings, including the murder of Jaswinder Kaur Sidhu, the murder of Amandeep Atwal, the double murder of Khatera Sadiqi and her fiancé, and the Shafia family murders.

A 2007 study by Dr. Amin Muhammad and Dr. Sujay Patel of Memorial University investigated how the practice of honour killings was brought to Canada. The report explained that "When people come and settle in Canada they can bring their traditions and forcefully follow them. In some cultures, people feel that some boundaries are never to be crossed, and if someone would violate those practices or go against them, then killing is justified to them." The report noted that "In different cultures, they can get away without being punished—the courts actually sanction them under religious contexts". The report also said that the people who commit these crimes are usually mentally ill and that the mental health aspect is often ignored by Western observers because of a lack of understanding of the insufficiently developed state of mental healthcare in developing countries in which honour killings are prevalent.

=== United States ===
Several honor killings have occurred in the U.S. during recent years. In 1989, in St. Louis, Missouri, 16-year-old Palestina "Tina" Isa was murdered by her Palestinian father with the aid of his wife. Her parents were dissatisfied with her "westernized" lifestyle. In 2008, in Georgia, 25-year-old Sandeela Kanwal was murdered by her Pakistani father for refusing an arranged marriage. Amina and Sarah Said, two teenage sisters from Texas, were murdered, allegedly by their Egyptian father, Yaser Abdel Said, who was at large until his capture in Texas in August 2020. Aasiya Zubair was, together with her husband Muzzammil Hassan, the founder and owner of Bridges TV, the first American Muslim English-language television network. She was murdered by her husband in 2009. Phyllis Chesler argues that this crime was an honor killing. In 2009, in Arizona, Noor Almaleki, aged 20, was murdered by her father, an Iraqi immigrant, because she had refused an arranged marriage and was living with her boyfriend.

The extent of honor-based violence in the U.S. is not known, because no official data is collected. There is controversy about the reasons why such violence occurs, and about the extent to which culture, religion, and views on women cause these incidents.

=== Brazil ===
Throughout the 20th century, husbands have used the "legitimate defense of their honor" (legítima defesa da honra) as justification for adultery-related killings in court cases. Although this defense was not explicitly stipulated in the 20th-century Criminal Code, it has been successfully pleaded by lawyers throughout the 20th century, in particular in the interior of the country, though less so in the coastal big cities. In 1991 Brazil's Supreme Court explicitly rejected the "honor defense" as having no basis in Brazilian law.

Crimes of passion within Latin America have also been compared to honor killings. As with honor killings, crimes of passion often feature the murder of a woman by a husband, family member, or boyfriend, and the crime is often condoned or sanctioned. In Peru, for example, 70 percent of the murders of women in one year were committed by a husband, boyfriend, or lover, and most often jealousy or suspicions of infidelity are cited as the reasons for the murders. El Salvador ranks the worst in the world on the UN rankings of femicide.

The view that violence can be justified in the name of honor and shame exists traditionally in Latin American societies, and machismo is often described as a code of honor. While some ideas originated in the Spanish colonial culture, others predate it: in the early history of Peru, the laws of the Incas allowed husbands to starve their wives to death if they committed adultery, while Aztec laws in early Mexico stipulated stoning or strangulation as punishment for female adultery.

Until the 1990s, the marriage of a girl or woman to the man who had raped her was considered a "solution" to the incident in order to restore her family's 'honor'. In fact, although laws that exonerate the perpetrator of rape if he marries his victim after the rape are often associated with the Middle East, such laws were very common around the world until the second half of the 20th century. As late as 1997, fourteen Latin American countries had such laws although most of these countries have since abolished them. Such laws were ended in Mexico in 1991, El Salvador in 1996, Colombia in 1997, Peru in 1999, Chile in 1999, Brazil in 2005, Uruguay in 2005, Guatemala in 2006, Costa Rica in 2007, Panama in 2008, Nicaragua in 2008, Argentina in 2012, and Ecuador in 2014.

== Oceania ==
=== Australia ===
A number of attempted honor killings have occurred within Australia, among Muslim immigrant communities residing there.

Pela Atroshi was a Kurdish 19-year-old woman who was murdered by her uncle in Iraqi Kurdistan in 1999. The decision to murder her was taken by a council of her male relatives, led by Pela's grandfather, Abdulmajid Atroshi, who lived in Australia. One of his sons, Shivan Atroshi, who helped with the murder, also lived in Australia. Pela Atroshi was living in Sweden, but was taken by family members to Iraqi Kurdistan to be murdered, as ordered by a family council of male relatives living in Sweden and Australia because they claimed she had tarnished the family honor. Pela Atroshi's murder was officially deemed an honor killing by authorities.

In 2010, Hazairin Iskandar was found guilty of an honor killing, after he and his adult son killed his wife's lover in Sydney. Iskander had stated that adultery was against Islam, and that was the motivation for the attack. He was jailed for a minimum of 18 years. The judge in the case stated from an Australian legal and ethical perspective, "'honor killings' have no place in Australian society and must be seriously punished because women are not the chattels or possession of men"

Also In 2010, in New South Wales, Indonesian born Hazairin Iskandar and his son murdered the lover of Iskandar's wife. Iskandar stabbed the victim with a knife while his son bashed him with a hammer. The court was told that the reason for the murder was the perpetrators' belief that extramarital affairs were against their religion; and that the murder was carried out to protect the honor of the family and was a "pre-planned, premeditated and executed killing". The judge said that: "No society or culture that regards itself as civilized can tolerate to any extent, or make any allowance for, the killing of another person for such an amorphous concept as an honor".

An attempt at an honor killing was made by a Muslim Pakistani family living in the state of Victoria in 2024. The daughter in the family was dating a Christian boy she had met at University. The family members held her down, while the father stabbed her. The daughter however survived and the father and family were charged.

Jim Spigelman (who served as Chief Justice of the Supreme Court of New South Wales from 19 May 1998 until 31 May 2011) said that Australia's increasing diversity was creating conflicts about how to deal with the customs and traditions of immigrant populations. He said: "There are important racial, ethnic and religious minorities in Australia who come from nations with sexist traditions which, in some respects, are even more pervasive than those of the West." He said that honor crimes, forced marriages and other violent acts against women were becoming a problem in Australia.
