= Murder of Samaira Nazir =

2005 honour killing in Southall, England

Samaira Nazir
- Samaira Nazir
- Born: 1979; London, England
- Died: 23 April 2005 (aged 25); Southall, London, England
- Cause of death: Murder by stabbing
- Education: Thames Valley University
- Occupation: Recruitment Consultant
- Known for: Honour killing victim

Samaira Nazir (c. 1979 – 23 April 2005) was a 25-year-old British Pakistani woman who was murdered by her brother and cousin in an honour killing in Southall, London.

Nazir was murdered for refusing to enter into an arranged marriage and for rejecting her parents' choices of suitors from Pakistan. Instead, she became engaged to someone of her own choosing who was from a different caste and deemed unsuitable.

Samaira's father was also implicated in her murder but fled to Pakistan while on bail. His family claimed that he died while a fugitive in Pakistan.

== Background ==
Samaira was born circa 1979 to Azhar Nazir, Sr. and Irshad Begum. Described as "the brightest of the family", she studied travel and tourism at Thames Valley University, taking a directorship role at her brother's recruitment consultancy business following graduation.

The Nazir family also owned the Rana Brothers Grocery store in Southall Broadway where Samaira's brother, Azhar Nazir, worked and first met Salman Mohammed. Mohammed had arrived in the United Kingdom from Afghanistan as an illegal immigrant in 2000 and had approached Nazir for help finding accommodation and work. Samaira met Mohammed through his involvement with her brother; their relationship developed over several years, but knowing that Samaira's family would not approve, they kept the relationship a secret until, ultimately, they fell in love and decided they wanted to marry.

Samaira had twice been taken to Pakistan to find a suitor for an arranged marriage but rejected her family's choices. Her family rejected Mohammed because of his origin; he was from a lower caste, and they felt he wanted to marry Samaira to have access to the family wealth. Additionally, he'd already contracted a marriage of convenience to support his immigration status and Samaira's brother claimed he was dishonest and involved in illegal activities.

Regardless, in March 2005, Samaira told her family that she was engaged to Mohammed; Mohammed claimed that Samaira's father had threatened him with a knife and that her brother had threatened to kill them both as a result of their engagement.

== Murder and investigation ==
On 23 April 2005, Mohammed and Samaira had attempted to meet with her mother away from the family home, but her mother refused; Nazir then instructed Samaira to return home, where he, her father and mother were waiting for her. Also in attendance was Imran Mohammed (real name Kashif Rana), a 17-year-old illegal immigrant from Pakistan; referred to as a "distant cousin", he lived in an out-building in the garden of the Nazir family home and was considered part of the family.

A bitter argument broke out about Samaira's future and she was held down and attacked by her brother Azhar Nazir, Imran Mohammed and, allegedly, her father as well. She was stabbed multiple times and her throat was slashed in what was described as a "prolonged and frenzied attack". Neighbours were alerted by her screams for help; one neighbour knocked on the door but was rebuffed by Nazir, who claimed his sister was "having fits." At one point, Samaira managed to open the front door in a bid to escape, but her brother pulled her back inside by her hair. The attack was witnessed by Samaira's mother and Nazir's daughters, aged two and four.

From the outset Nazir denied that he had played any part in his sister's murder, apportioning blame entirely on Imran Mohammed. Mohammed openly admitted responsibility for Samaira's death and insisted that he had acted alone. The police and prosecutors were not convinced and suspected that Mohammed had been instructed to kill Samaira by other members of the family, with prosecutor Nazir Afzal stating: "We knew there was a wider web of guilt (...) We had to break the omertà, the code of silence. We knew the people involved would not talk."

Covert listening devices were deployed in the family home, and sufficient circumstantial evidence was obtained to justify the arrest of Nazir and Nazir Sr. Both were charged, but Nazir Sr. was released on bail and fled to Pakistan before the trial. The family claimed that he later died there, but the police were sceptical.

== Legal proceedings ==
Azhar Nazir and Imran Mohammed stood trial at the Central Criminal Court, with Nazir maintaining his innocence and Mohammed using the partial defence of diminished responsibility. The prosecution's case was one of joint enterprise.

Nazir acknowledged that he did not approve of Samaira's relationship and accepted that he was present when she was killed, but he maintained that he had only witnessed the latter part of the struggle between his sister and Imran Mohammed, that he had seen this from a distance, and that he had neither participated in the murder nor played a part in planning or executing it. Despite claiming to be "horrified" by what he was witnessing, he conceded that he did not try to intervene. The forensic evidence of airborne blood on his clothing was not consistent with his account of witnessing the murder from a distance, and two witnesses testified that Samaira was dragged back into the house when she tried to escape, one of whom identified Nazir directly as the individual who had dragged Samaira back into the house.

On 15 June 2006, Imran Mohammed was found unanimously guilty of murder. On 16 June 2006, Nazir was convicted of the same by an 11-1 majority verdict. On 14 July 2006, both were sentenced to life imprisonment; Mohammed was detained at Her Majesty's pleasure for a minimum of 10 years and Nazir received a minimum tariff of 20 years.

Nazir Afzal, area director for the Crown Prosecution Service, who was responsible for the prosecution, stated:

"Samaira was murdered because she loved the wrong person in her family's eyes. In that sense it was an 'honour killing' to protect the perceived status of the family [...] We hope that Samaira's death and the investigation and prosecution that followed will deter others who may wish to harm their own family members because of practices that are as tragic as they are outdated."

John Reid, a Detective Inspector from the Metropolitan Police who worked on the case, said, "There is nothing at all honourable about her brutal death."

Azhar Nazir appealed against his conviction, but the appeal was duly dismissed in February 2009.

== See also ==
Honour killings in the United Kingdom:

- Murder of Shafilea Ahmed
- Murder of Rania Alayed
- Murder of Banaz Mahmod
- The killing in India of Surjit Athwal was planned in the UK.
- Murder of Tulay Goren
- Murder of Heshu Yones
- Murder of Rukhsana Naz

Honour killings of people of Pakistani heritage outside of Pakistan and the UK:

- Murder of Sandeela Kanwal (United States)
- Murder of Ghazala Khan (Denmark)
- Murder of Aqsa Parvez (Canada)
- Murder of Hina Saleem (Italy)
- Murder of Sadia Sheikh (Belgium)
