= Murder of Ghazala Khan =

Honour killing in Denmark

- Ghazala Khan's passport image
- Date: September 23, 2005
- Location: Slagelse, Denmark
- Type: Honour killing
- Target: Ghazala Khan (died) *Emal Khan (survived)
- Organized by: Ghazala Khan's father
- Participants: Nine people

Ghazala Khan (Punjabi and Urdu: غزالہ خان; 29 October 1986 – 23 September 2005) was a Danish woman of Pakistani descent, who was shot and killed in Denmark by her brother, after she had married against the will of the family. The murder of Ghazala had been ordered by her father to save the family honour, making it an honour killing. Nine people from her family took part in arranging and performing the murder. All were all found guilty by Østre Landsret (the High Court of Eastern Denmark) on June 27 2006 on counts of murder and attempted murder (of her husband).

This ruling marked the first time in Europe that such a large group of people had been judged collectively guilty for murder. Her father received a life sentence, while her brother, who carried out the shooting, received sixteen years. The rest of the family received between eight and fourteen years.

Some experts claimed that the conviction will serve as precedent throughout Europe for future similar cases and that the sentences will send a strong signal and have a noticeable deterrent effect. Manu Sareen, a youth worker helping girls facing arranged marriages, said, "It will have a preventive effect. Some families may abandon similar plans because of today's ruling."

== Background ==
Ghazala Khan's father, Ghulum Abbas, was from Punjab, Pakistan. He left Punjab in 1970. Ghazala was born in Denmark and held Danish citizenship.

For three years prior to her murder, Ghazala had an intimate relationship with her future husband, Afghan asylum seeker Emal Khan. The two met on a flight from Pakistan and began a long-distance relationship via email. Ghazala, although a Danish citizen, grew up in Pakistan.

Ghazala kept the relationship secret, fearing her family's reaction. She eventually revealed her feelings to her mother, who became outraged and beat her, along with her older brother Akhtar Abbas, who would later shoot her. Emal Khan reported that after that incident, Ghazala was locked inside the house and "frozen out" by the rest of her family, all of whom refused to speak to her or eat with her.

Finally, on 5 September 2005 she managed to escape her family and live with Emal. Her brother reported her missing, and the family began an intense search. Until Ghazala's murder, the couple lived with various friends in Denmark. They repeatedly contacted the police for protection, but were denied help. On 21 September they married at the registry office in Middelfart.

== Attack ==
Two days after the wedding, the Abbas family, pretending to want to come to a peaceful reconciliation, convinced the newlywed couple to attend a meeting at the railway station in Slagelse. Ghazala's brother shot both Ghazala and Emal Khan. Ghazala died instantly, managing only to say "brother, what are you doing?"

Emal, who was shot twice in the abdominal region, survived after a lengthy operation.

== The criminal proceedings ==
The court case against the nine persons convicted of the murder of Ghazala was initiated on 15 May 2006. On 26 June, the court's juridical head instructed the jury that all involved could be convicted based on the evidence presented. On the 27 June, the jury found all of the indicted family members and family friends guilty of conspiracy to commit murder. On 28 June, the sentences of the nine guilty set by the jury were as follows, with permanent banishment from Denmark being ordered for all convicted persons who were not Danish citizens:

- Ghulam Abbas – Ghazala's father, 57 years of age, taxi driver living in Denmark since 1970, convicted of ordering the murder of Ghazala and her husband: sentenced to life in prison.
- Akhtar Abbas – Ghazala's older brother, 30 years of age, taxi driver living in Denmark since 1986, convicted of firing the gun that killed Ghazala and injured Emal Khan: sentenced to 16 years in prison.
- Wallayat Khan – Ghazala's maternal uncle, 46 years of age, taxi driver living in Denmark since 1987, sought out together with Ghazala's father those individuals who had helped hide Ghazala and Emal, was in Ringsted at the time of the murder and followed the action on his cell phone: sentenced to 16 years in prison.
- Asghar Ali (the elder) – Ghazala's paternal uncle, 42 years of age, taxi driver living in Denmark since 1987, sought out together with Ghazala's father those individuals who had helped hide Ghazala and Emal, was in Ringsted at the time of the murder and followed the action on his cell phone: sentenced to 16 years in prison.
- Perveen Khan – Ghazala's aunt by marriage to Ghazala's (convicted) uncle Walayat Khan, 40 years of age, stay-at-home mother of four, living in Denmark since 1994, kept contact with Ghazala and Emal in order to keep the family informed of their whereabouts and arranged the mock reconciliation during which Ghazala was murdered: sentenced to 14 years in prison followed by permanent banishment from Denmark.
- Asghar Ali (the younger) – Ghazala's paternal uncle, 31 years of age, unemployed and living in Denmark since 2001, history of drug- and alcohol-related issues, present in car with Ghazala's brother on the way to the mock reconciliation and murder and was heard bragging to others about what the family had done in the days following the murder: sentenced to 14 years in prison followed by permanent banishment from Denmark.
- Anser Iqbal – Friend of the family, 45 years of age, taxi driver living in Denmark since 1976, accompanied Ghazala's aunt to the mock reconciliation and remained in constant phone contact with the rest of the family throughout the events leading up to and during the murder: sentenced to 10 years in prison.
- Ghulam Ahmed – Friend of the family, 36 years of age, taxi driver living in Denmark since 1987, was aware of the family's plans to murder Ghazala and was present in the car that drove Ghazala's brother to the mock reconciliation and murder: sentenced to 10 years in prison followed by permanent banishment from Denmark.
- Naweed Sharif – Friend of the family, 30 years of age, taxi driver born in Denmark, drove Ghazala's brother to the murder: sentenced to 8 years in prison.

== See also ==
Honour killings of people of Pakistani heritage outside of Pakistan

- Shafilea Ahmed (United Kingdom)
- Sandeela Kanwal (United States)
- Samaira Nazir (United Kingdom)
- Aqsa Parvez (Canada)
- Hina Saleem (Italy)
- Sadia Sheikh (Belgium)
