= Murder of Hina Saleem =

Honour killing of a Pakistani woman in Italy

Hina Saleem
- Born: 19 December 1985; Gujrat, Pakistan
- Died: 11 August 2006 (aged 20); Zanano di Sarezzo, Italy
- Resting place: Monumental Cemetery of Brescia, Brescia, Italy
- Occupation: Server at a pizzeria
- Known for: Honour killing victim

Hina Saleem (19 December 1985 – 11 August 2006) was a Pakistani woman resident in Italy who was the victim of an honour killing, in Zanano di Sarezzo, province of Brescia, Lombardy, Italy.

== Background ==
Saleem was born in Gujrat, Pakistan. Her father Mohammad Saleem began living in Italy circa 1996 and worked in a saucepan factory there. Hina worked as a server at a pizza parlour and had an Italian boyfriend, a carpenter, who she cohabitated with.

Mohammad expressed disagreement with Hina's life choices after the family arrived in Italy, complaining about her Westernisation due to the Western boyfriend and her habit of smoking cigarettes, and he instead wanted her in an arranged marriage. Authorities stated that the family gave considerable pressure against Hina to get her to return to Pakistan for marriage. Peter Popham of The Independent wrote that in regards to Hina and her family, "Her relations with them had been strained for years."

Whilst Saleem was of immigrant origins and a resident of Northern Italy, honour killings had long been an issue with the native Southern Italian population; Italian laws previously allowed for the pardoning of crimes for honour reasons, but these laws were repealed in 1981. Until 1981, Italian law was permissive of honour killings under certain circumstances, with the Criminal Code providing mitigating circumstances for such killings; until 1981 the law read: "Art. 587: He who causes the death of a spouse, daughter, or sister upon discovering her in illegitimate carnal relations and in the heat of passion caused by the offense to his honour or that of his family will be sentenced from three to seven years. The same sentence shall apply to whom, in the above circumstances, causes the death of the person involved in illegitimate carnal relations with his spouse, daughter, or sister." The murder of Saleem brought Italy’s own history of honour killing into discussion.

== Crime ==
Mohammad contacted Hina and asked her to come to the house in Brescia to meet a cousin visiting in the area. There Mohammad slit Hina's throat twenty-eight times. Hina's boyfriend reported her missing on Saturday 19 August 2006 and the Carabinieri searched the house, finding the body buried in the garden and blood in Hina's bedroom.

== Aftermath ==
Saleem was buried in the Muslim section of Monumental Cemetery of Brescia (a.k.a. Cimitero Vantiniano) in Brescia. Mohammad received a prison sentence of 30 years. In 2016 Saleem's mother stated that she forgave her husband, and that the media articles inaccurately portrayed the family as being against western culture when this was not the case.

On 11 August 2007, the Centro di salute internazionale e medicina transculturale (Centre of International and Intercultural Health) of Brescia, was dedicated to Hina.

In November 2007, Saleem's father and two of her brothers-in-law were each convicted of murder and sentenced to 30 years in prison.

Italian Interior Minister Giuliano Amato stated that the event made him reconsider a plan to reduce the waiting period for Italian citizenship; he previously proposed reducing it from ten to five. Popham wrote the event "has sparked a fierce debate in Italy about how to deal with the "clash of civilisations". L'Osservatore Romano criticised the event.

Marco Ventura and Giommaria Monti co-wrote a book called Hina: questa è la mia vita ("Hina: This is my life").

== See also ==
- Pakistanis in Italy
- Honour killing in Pakistan
- Un delitto d'onore - A book about honour killings in Italy

Honour killings of people of Pakistani heritage outside of Pakistan

- Shafilea Ahmed (United Kingdom)
- Sandeela Kanwal (United States)
- Gazala Khan (Denmark)
- Rukhsana Naz (United Kingdom)
- Samaira Nazir (United Kingdom)
- Aqsa Parvez (Canada)
- Sadia Sheikh (Belgium)

== Bibliography ==
- Monti, Giommaria; Marco Ventura (2011). Hina: questa è la mia vita (in Italian). Edizioni Piemme. ISBN 978-88-566-1488-6.
