= Murder of Sandeela Kanwal =

Honor killing of a Pakistani woman in Georgia, USA

Sandeela Kanwal was a Pakistani woman living in the Atlanta metropolitan area in Clayton County, Georgia, who was murdered by her father Chaudhry Rashid in an honor killing, on July 6, 2008.

== Background ==
Kanwal, aged 25, worked at a Wal-Mart, and her father, Chaudhry Rashid, born in a village in Pakistan, aged 54 and holding United States permanent residency, ran a pizza restaurant in East Point, Georgia. At the time Rashid was married to a woman who was not Kanwal's mother. Rashid's main languages were Punjabi and Urdu. Kanwal and her father lived in a house in Clayton County, near Jonesboro, with their respective spouses and family members.

Kanwal had wed her husband in Gujrat, Punjab, Pakistan on March 14, 2002. In November 2005, Kanwal and her brother purchased the Clayton County house. Circa April 2008, Kanwal and her husband held a marriage ceremony in Pakistan, but the two moved to different cities in the U.S. after her wedding, with the husband moving to Chicago. She resided with her father and did not see her husband after arriving in the U.S. On April 15, they separated, and she filed for divorce on July 1.

A police report stated that from circa May until Kanwal's death, the father and daughter did not communicate with one another. The evening of her death, while the father was driving his daughter back to the house from a late shift at the Wal-Mart, the two had an argument.

== Crime and punishment ==
In the early hours of July 6, 2008, Kanwal's father strangled her with a bungee cord. Her body was left in a bedroom on the house's second floor. Rashid burned the bungee cord and flushed the ashes down the toilet, leaving authorities without a murder weapon.

The killer's wife called police after leaving the house because she heard screaming in a language incomprehensible to her. Rashid experienced a seizure upon his arrest and was jailed after being hospitalized briefly. The arrest warrant stated that the father said that the divorce caused the family to lose honor.

Due to Rashid's lack of English fluency, he had a court-appointed translator. He also followed Islamic dietary laws while in the county jail. In the trial Rashid's legal team admitted that he committed homicide, but stated that he had no plans to do so and was only spurred by momentary anger. Rashid's lawyers argued that it was not an honor killing.

Rashid was convicted of felony and malice murder and aggravated assault in May 2011, a decision that took jurors four hours. He received a life imprisonment sentence with parole eligibility. Rashid appealed his conviction on the basis that it was wrong for jurors to review footage of his interviews held at a police station. In 2013 the Georgia Supreme Court upheld Rashid's conviction.

== See also ==
- Honor killing in the United States

- Ali Irsan (killed Gelareh Bagherzadeh and Coty Beavers)
- Noor Almaleki
- Murder of Tina Isa
- Yaser Abdel Said (killed Amina and Sarah Said)
Honor killings of people of Pakistani heritage outside of Pakistan:
- Shafilea Ahmed (United Kingdom)
- Gazala Khan (Denmark)
- Samaira Nazir (United Kingdom)
- Aqsa Parvez (Canada)
- Hina Saleem (Italy)
- Sadia Sheikh (Belgium)

- Honour killing in Pakistan
- Forced marriage
