= Killing of Fatemeh Soltani =

2025 crime in Iran

Fatemeh Soltani
- Born: 11 December 2007; Eslamshahr, Iran
- Died: 16 April 2025 (aged 17); Eslamshahr
- Cause of death: Killed by her father
- Father: Khanali Soltani

On April 16, 2025, 17-year-old Iranian girl Fatemeh Soltani (b. December 11, 2007) was killed by her father in the city of Eslamshahr, Tehran Province. Her death was widely covered in Persian-language media and social networks as another instance of honor killings in Iran, sparking debate about legal protections and the murder of women in the country.

== Crime ==
On the morning of Thursday, April 16, 2025, Fatemeh's father contacted her through a phone number she had publicly shared on her Instagram page for work-related communication. Pretending to be a client, he obtained her workplace address and went to the beauty salon where she worked. In front of the salon, on the street, and in full view of passersby, he attacked Fatemeh with furious shouts and stabbed her 14 times, killing her. After committing the murder, he turned himself in to the police.

=== Motive ===
According to media reports citing Fatemeh Soltani’s family, her support for her mother against domestic violence, her exposure of her father's infidelity and immoral behavior, and her desire for financial independence were reasons behind the murder. In his confession, the father cited family disputes as the motive for his crime.

== Reactions ==
Fatemeh Soltani’s murder sparked a wave of outrage and sorrow among women’s rights activists and social media users. Many called for reforms in laws concerning domestic killings, especially those involving women. One major criticism was the legal gap in imposing strict penalties on fathers who murder their children.

=== Consequences and legal aspects ===
Under Iranian law, a father, as the "guardian of blood" (vali-e dam), often faces reduced punishment if he kills his child and, in many cases, is exempt from the qisas (retributive justice) penalty. This issue was once again criticized in the case of Fatemeh Soltani. Some legal experts, pointing to the need for reform, called for a fundamental revision of Articles 301 and 302 of the Islamic Penal Code.
