= Murders of Leila Hussein and Rand Abdel-Qader =

2008 murders in Iraq

Leila Hussein (c. 1967 – May 17, 2008) was an Iraqi woman living in Basra who came to public attention in March 2008, when her husband killed their teenage daughter Rand Abdel Qader — reportedly with the approval of local police — after suspecting that she was in a relationship with a British soldier stationed in the city. Hussein left her husband immediately after the murder, and went into hiding. In an interview with The Observer, she spoke out against the so-called honour killing of her daughter. She had intended to leave Iraq for Jordan with the help of an Iraqi women's rights group.

She was shot dead in Basra by unknown assailants on May 17, 2008, the day she had planned to leave the country. The Observer reports that local police are not certain that she was the target of the shooting.

== Early life ==
Hussein was born into a Shiite Muslim family. She was an orphan, and was raised by an uncle, who was himself killed during the Shia uprising in the 1990s against Saddam Hussein.

== Murder of Rand Abdel-Qader ==
Hussein's daughter, Rand Abdel-Qader (b. June 23, 1990), was a student at Basra University. In 2007, while working as a volunteer with displaced Iraqi families, she formed a friendship with a 22-year-old British soldier who had been distributing water. She later told her mother she had spoken to him because she was the only English speaker in the group. Although the friendship was by all accounts innocent, Rand confided to a friend that she had developed romantic feelings for the man.

In March 2008, months after the girl and the soldier had last seen one another, news of the friendship reached her father, a former government employee. He decided that she had dishonoured the family, and on March 16, he stamped on her head, choked her, and stabbed her until she was dead. Rand's brothers are reported to have helped him. She was buried in a makeshift grave, which her uncles reportedly spat on.

The father was arrested by local police and held for two hours before being released without charge. In an interview with The Observer, he admitted that he had killed his daughter, and said that the police had congratulated him. He told the newspaper that his only regret was that he did not kill her at birth.

== Shooting ==
After her daughter's killing, Hussein denounced her husband, and left the family home, reportedly after being beaten and having her arm broken, going into hiding with the help of an NGO women's group, who planned to help her escape Iraq to Amman, Jordan.

Her husband told The Observer that his daughter had inherited "bad genes" from her mother. In a separate interview in April 2008, Hussein made it clear that she feared for her life, telling the newspaper, "No man can accept being left by a woman in Iraq. But I would prefer to be killed than sleep in the same bed as a man who was able to do what he did to his own daughter." She moved constantly between safe houses, spending no more than four days in any one.

She was gunned down in the street while walking toward a taxi with two women's rights activists, on their way to meet a contact who was going to smuggle her into Jordan. A car reportedly containing three men drew up alongside the women, and five bullets were fired, three of which hit Hussein. The women activists were also shot and were admitted to a hospital.

A senior police officer in Basra said police believe the women activists were the targets, not Hussein. Two other activists from the same group have been killed since 2006: one was raped before being shot, and the second, the only man who had worked for the group, was shot at the beginning of 2008.

== See also ==
- Honor killing
- Women's rights in Iraq
