= Honor killing =

Type of murder

An "honor killing", also called a shame killing, refers to murder that is committed by members of the victim's family or intimate partner with the motivation of preserving or recovering the "honor" that the victim is perceived as having violated or lost as a result of their actions, which may be a source of shame in their society. Most cases of honor killings happen in the form of femicide, and are likewise a frequent manifestation of violence against women in regions of the world where there are traditional or legal norms that greatly restrict women's rights and freedoms.

Moral standards in a community tend to be based on different codes of behavior for men and women, particularly with regard to women's sexual freedom. In many families, the "family honor" motive is used by men as a pretext to enforce the restriction of women's rights, and honor killings are performed in communities with the intent to punish violations of social, sexual, religious, or general familial norms or hierarchies. Communities in which honor killings occur impose social rejection and social exclusion on dishonored families, with the only way to save face being to kill whoever brought the dishonor upon the family.

While the behaviors and actions that lead to honor killings can vary by the established societal norms of a region, they are most often choices of an intimate nature, such as refusing to enter into an arranged or forced marriage; seeking a divorce or marital separation; or engaging in premarital or extramarital sex. However, several non-intimate personal choices may also result in honor killings as well, such as converting to another religion; associating with others outside of one's caste; or dressing in a way that is regarded as diverging from sexual norm (e.g., a man wearing women's clothing) in the community. Furthermore, it is also common for people to be targeted for honor killings if they become victims of rape or sexual assault; or for having a taboo characteristic such as not identifying as heterosexual or for having a disability.

These killings are condemned by international conventions, including by legally binding documents like the Istanbul Convention, and by human rights organizations worldwide. Even so, they remain widespread and some religious and cultural communities continue to justify and encourage them wherever these communities hold influence. Each year, approximately 5,000 people are reported as having been murdered in the name of honor. Honor killings are primarily associated with the Middle East and North Africa and South Asia, but they also occur in other regions, such as the Philippines, East Africa, Chechnya, Latin America, and historically in Mediterranean Europe. Because of this, they also appear among the diaspora communities of these groups, even in countries whose broader social norms do not condone the practice. Though honor killings are often linked to rural and tribal areas, they occur in urban areas, too.

== Characteristics ==
Human Rights Watch defines "honor killings" as follows:

Honor crimes are acts of violence, usually murder, committed by male family members against female family members who are perceived to have brought dishonor upon the family. A woman can be targeted by her family for a variety of reasons including, refusing to enter into an arranged marriage, being the victim of a sexual assault, seeking a divorce—even from an abusive husband—or committing adultery. The mere perception that a woman has acted in a manner to bring "dishonor" to the family is sufficient to trigger an attack.

Men can also be the victims of honor killings, either committed by family members of a woman with whom they are perceived to have an inappropriate relationship; or by members of their own families, the latter often connected to homosexuality or disability diagnosis.

Many honor killings are planned by multiple members of a family, sometimes through a formal "family council". The threat of murder is used as a means to control behavior, especially concerning sexuality and marriage, which may be seen as a duty for some or all family members to uphold. Family members may feel compelled to act to preserve the local reputation of the family and avoid stigma or shunning, particularly in tight-knit communities. Perpetrators often do not face negative stigma within their communities, because their behavior is seen as justified. In a 2010 study of the Arab world, Abu-Odeh argues that reported cases show poor women to be more frequently the victims of honor killings, while upper-class women, whose social environment affords them greater mobility, face considerably less risk.

According to Israeli Arab Ibrahim Adas, who murdered his sister, "your honor often depends on what the women in your family do...In Arab society, there is no such thing as a woman being with a man without him first coming to the family and asking for her hand in marriage. If something like that happens to a family, they lose their honor in the eyes of the entire village. The only way out is to earn their honor back."

Methods of murdering include stoning, stabbing, beating, burning, beheading, hanging, throat slashing, lethal acid attacks, shooting, and strangulation. Sometimes, communities perform murders in public to warn others in the community of the possible consequences of engaging in what is seen as illicit behavior.

Often, minor girls and boys are selected by the family to act as the murderers, so that the murderer may benefit from the most favorable legal outcome. Boys and sometimes women in the family are often asked to closely control and monitor the behavior of their siblings or other members of the family, to ensure that they do not do anything to tarnish the 'honor' and 'reputation' of the family. The boys are often asked to carry out the murder, and if they refuse, they may face serious repercussions from the family and community for failing to perform their "duty".

=== Comparison to other forms of murder ===
Honor killings, along with dowry killings (most of which are committed in South Asia), gang-related murderings of women as revenge (killings of female members of rival gang members' families—most of which are committed in Latin America) and witchcraft accusation killings (most of which are committed in Africa and Oceania) are some of the most recognized forms of femicide.

Human rights advocates have compared "honor killings" to "crimes of passion" in Latin America (which are sometimes treated extremely leniently) and the murdering of women for lack of dowry in India.

Some commentators have stressed the point that the focus on honor killings should not lead people to ignore other forms of gender-based murdering of women, in particular, those which occur in Latin America (femicides such as "crimes of passion" and gang-related killings); the murder rate of women in this region is extremely high, with El Salvador being reported as the country with the highest rate of murders of women in the world. In 2002, Widney Brown, advocacy director for Human Rights Watch, stated that "crimes of passion have a similar dynamic in that the women are murdered by male family members and the crimes are perceived as excusable or understandable".

== Causes ==
There are multiple causes for which honor killings occur, and numerous factors interact with each other.

=== Culture ===
The cultural features that lead to honor killings are complex. Honor killings involve violence and fear as tools for maintaining control. Honor killings are argued to have their origins among nomadic peoples and herdsmen: such populations carry all their valuables with them and risk having them stolen, and they do not have proper recourse to law. As a result, inspiring fear, using aggression, and cultivating a reputation for violent revenge to protect property is preferable to other behaviors. In societies where there is a weak rule of law, people must build fierce reputations.

In many cultures where honor is of a central value, men are sources, or active generators/agents, of that honor, while the only effect that women can have on honor is to destroy it. Once the family's or clan's honor is considered to have been destroyed by a woman, there is a need for immediate revenge to restore it, for the family to avoid losing face in the community. An Amnesty International statement notes:

The regime of honor is unforgiving: women on whom suspicion has fallen are not allowed to defend themselves, and family members have no socially acceptable alternative but to remove the stain on their honor by attacking the woman.

The relation between social views on female sexuality and honor killings are complex. The way through which women in honor-based societies are considered to bring dishonor to men is often through their sexual behavior. Indeed, violence related to female sexual expression has been documented since Ancient Rome, when the pater familias had the right to murder an unmarried sexually active daughter or an adulterous wife.

Carolyn Fluehr-Lobban, an anthropology professor at Rhode Island College, writes that an act, or even alleged act, of any female sexual misconduct, upsets the moral order of the culture, and bloodshed is the only way to remove any shame brought by the actions and restore social equilibrium. However, the relation between honor and female sexuality is a complicated one, and some authors argue that it is not women's sexuality per se that is the 'problem', but rather women's self-determination in regard to it, as well as fertility. Sharif Kanaana, professor of anthropology at Birzeit University, says that honor killing is:

A complicated issue that cuts deep into the history of Islamic society. .. What the men of the family, clan, or tribe seek control of in a patrilineal society is reproductive power. Women for the tribe were considered a factory for making men. Honor killing is not a means to control sexual power or behavior. What's behind it is the issue of fertility or reproductive power.

In some cultures, honor killings are considered less serious than other murders simply because they arise from long-standing cultural traditions and are thus deemed appropriate or justifiable. Additionally, according to a poll done by the BBC's Asian network, 1 in 10 of the 500 young South Asians surveyed said they would condone any murder of someone who threatened their family's honor.

Nighat Taufeeq of the women's resource center Shirkatgah in Lahore, Pakistan says: "It is an unholy alliance that works against women: the killers take pride in what they have done, the tribal leaders condone the act and protect the killers and the police connive the cover-up." The lawyer and human rights activist Hina Jilani says, "The right to life of women in Pakistan is conditional on their obeying social norms and traditions."

A July 2008 Turkish study by a team from Dicle University on honor killings in the Southeastern Anatolia Region, the predominantly Kurdish area of Turkey, has so far shown that little if any social stigma is attached to honor killing. It also comments that the practice is not related to a feudal societal structure, "there are also perpetrators who are well-educated university graduates. Of all those surveyed, 60 percent are either high school or university graduates or at the very least, literate."

In contemporary times, the changing cultural and economic status of women has also been used to explain the occurrences of honor killings. Women in largely patriarchal cultures who have gained economic independence from their families go against their male-dominated culture. Some researchers argue that the shift towards greater responsibility for women and less for their fathers may cause their male family members to act in oppressive and sometimes violent manners to regain authority.

Fareena Alam, former editor of the British Muslim magazine Q-News, writes that honor killings that arise in Western cultures such as Britain are a tactic for immigrant families to cope with the alienating consequences of urbanization. Alam argues that immigrants remain close to the home culture and their relatives because it provides a safety net. She writes that

In villages "back home", a man's sphere of control was broader, with a large support system. In our cities full of strangers, there is virtually no control over who one's family members sit, talk or work with.

Alam argues that it is thus the attempt to regain control and the feelings of alienation that ultimately leads to an honor killing.

==== Cultures of honor and shame ====
The concept of family honor is extremely important in many communities worldwide. The UN estimates that 5,000 women and girls are murdered each year in honor killings, which are widely reported in the Middle East and South Asia, but they occur in countries as varied as Brazil, Canada, Iran, Israel, Italy, Jordan, Egypt, Sweden, Syria, Uganda, United Kingdom, the United States, and other countries. In honor cultures, managing reputation is an important social ethic. Men are expected to show strength and be intolerant of disrespect and women are expected to be loyal to the family and be chaste. An insult to one's personal or family honor must be met with a response, or the stain of dishonor can affect many others in the family and the wider community. Such acts often include female behaviors that are related to sex outside marriage or way of dressing, but may also include male homosexuality (like the emo killings in Iraq). The family may lose respect in the community and may be shunned by relatives. The only way they perceive that shame can be erased is through an honor killing. The cultures in which honor killings take place are usually considered "collectivist cultures", where the family is more important than the individual, and individual autonomy is seen as a threat to the family and its honor.

Honor killing is an ancient practice associated with patriarchal control; a 2021 literature review describes its motivation as based on cultural and moral codes common in certain communities, often reinforced by religion. Survey research on religiosity and attitudes toward honor killing has produced mixed results that vary by setting and by the dimension of religiosity measured. A survey of 856 ninth-grade students in Amman, Jordan, found that, after controlling for other factors, religion and the intensity of religious beliefs were not associated with support for honor killings. A national survey of Kuwait, a Muslim-majority country, found religiosity, tribal attachment, and support for political Islam to be positive predictors of support for honor-based violence. Younger individuals were found to be more likely to support honor-based violence, which was attributed to an increasing influence of conservative religious groups on national education. A cross-national study of Muslims found that mosque attendance and religious fundamentalism, but not private prayer, were associated with greater support for honor killings. A 2025 survey of university students in the West Bank found that male and Muslim respondents expressed greater justification for honor killing than female and non-Muslim respondents, respectively, though it emphasized the outsized role of patriarchal control as a coping mechanism against the Israeli occupation of the region. These studies measure attitudes rather than the incidence of killings. The ideology of honor is a cultural phenomenon that does not appear to be related to religion, be it Middle Eastern or Western countries, and honor killings likely have a long history in human societies which predate many modern religions.

Honor culture is more pervasive in places of economic vulnerability and the absence of the rule of law, where law enforcement cannot be counted on to protect them. People then resort to their reputations to protect them from social exploitation and a man must "stand up for himself" and not rely on others to do so. To lose one's honor is to lose this protective barrier. Possessing honor in such a society can grant social status and economic and social opportunities. When honor is ruined, a person or family in an honor culture can be socially ostracized, face restricted economic opportunities, and have a difficult time finding a mate.

A 2025 study in the American Sociological Review, using data from Turkey, found that honor killings were most common when honor norms are contested.

==== In Islam ====
Widney Brown, the advocacy director of Human Rights Watch, said that the practice "goes across cultures and religions". Resolution 1327 (2003) of the Council of Europe states that:

The Assembly notes that whilst so-called "honour crimes" emanate from cultural and not religious roots and are perpetrated worldwide (mainly in patriarchal societies or communities), the majority of reported cases in Europe have been amongst Muslim or migrant Muslim communities

Many Muslim commentators and organizations condemn honor killings as an un-Islamic cultural practice. There is no mention of honor killing (extrajudicial killing by a woman's family) in the Qur'an, and the practice violates Islamic law. Tahira Shaid Khan, a professor of women's issues at Aga Khan University, blames such murdering on attitudes (across different classes, ethnic, and religious groups) that view women as property with no rights of their own as the motivation for honor killings. Ali Gomaa, Egypt's former Grand Mufti, has also spoken out forcefully against honor killings.

As a more generic statement reflecting the wider Islamic scholarly trend, Jonathan A. C. Brown says that "questions about honor killings have regularly found their way into the inboxes of muftis like Yusuf Qaradawi or the late scholar Muhammad Husayn Fadlallah. Their responses reflect a rare consensus. No Muslim scholar of any note, either medieval or modern, has sanctioned a man killing his wife or sister for tarnishing her or the family's honor. If a woman or man found together were to deserve the death penalty for fornication, this would have to be established by the evidence required by the Qur'an: either a confession or the testimony of four male witnesses, all upstanding in the eyes of the court, who actually saw penetration occur."

Further, while honor killings are common in Pakistan, it is a practically unknown practice in other countries, such as Indonesia, Bangladesh (despite happening in some of its diasporas), Senegal, Qatar, and the United Arab Emirates.

The late Yemeni Muslim scholar Muḥammad Shawkānī wrote that one reason the Shari'a stipulates execution as a potential punishment for men who murder women is to counter honor killings for alleged slights of honor. He wrote, "There is no doubt that laxity on this matter is one of the greatest means leading to women's lives being destroyed, especially in the Bedouin regions, which are characterized by harsh-hardheartedness and a strong sense of honor and shame stemming from Pre-Islamic times".

=== Views on women ===
Honor killings are often a result of strongly misogynistic views towards women and the position of women in society. In these traditionally male-dominated societies, women are dependent first on their father and then on their husbands, whom they are expected to obey. Women are viewed as property and not as individuals with their own agency. As such, they must submit to male authority figures in the family—failure to do so can result in extreme violence as punishment. Violence is seen as a way of ensuring compliance and preventing rebellion. According to Shahid Khan, a professor at the Aga Khan University in Pakistan: "Women are considered the property of the males in their family irrespective of their class, ethnic, or religious group. The owner of the property has the right to decide its fate. The concept of ownership has turned women into a commodity which can be exchanged, bought and sold". In such cultures, women are not allowed to take control over their bodies and sexuality: these are the property of the males of the family, the father (and other male relatives) who must ensure virginity until marriage; and then the husband to whom his wife's sexuality is subordinated—a woman must not undermine the ownership rights of her guardian by engaging in premarital sex or adultery.

=== Laws and European colonialism ===
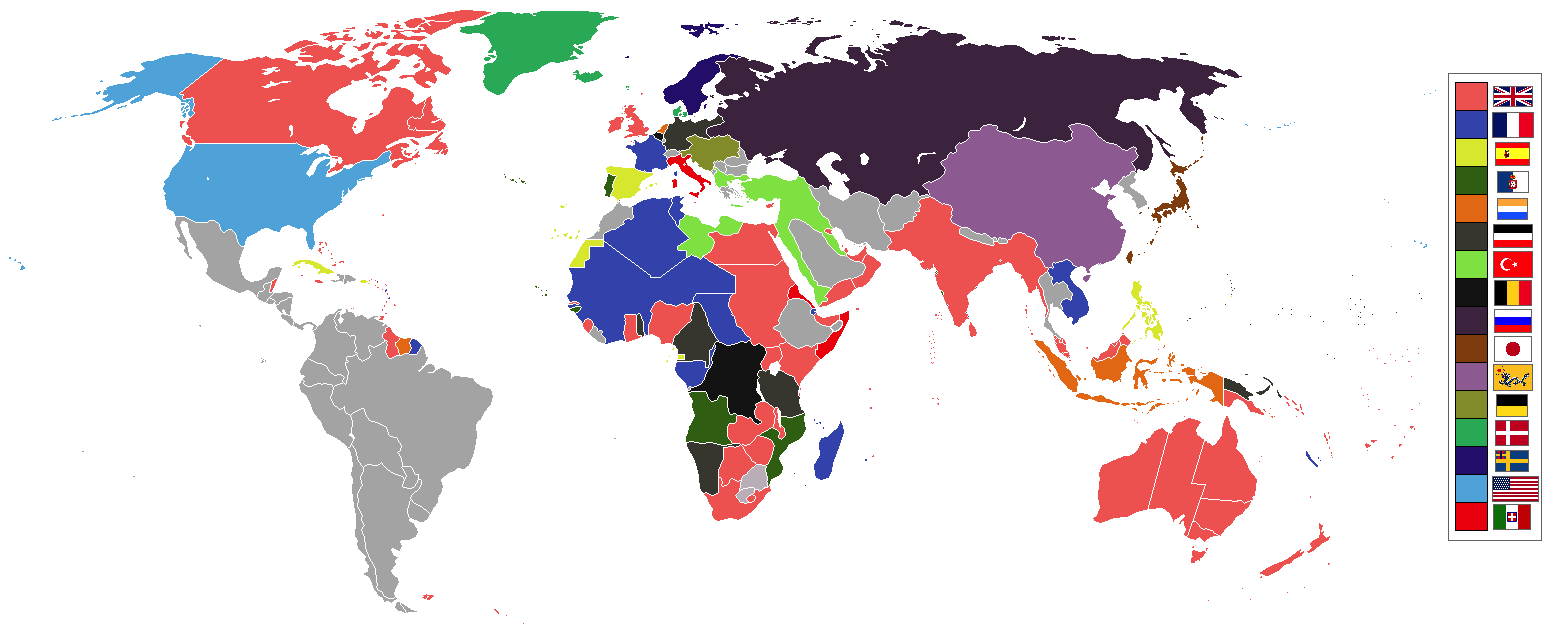
Imperial powers in 1898

Legal frameworks can encourage honor killings. Such laws include on one side leniency towards such murdering, and on the other side criminalization of various behaviors, such as extramarital sex, "indecent" dressing in public places, or homosexual sexual acts, with these laws acting as a way of reassuring perpetrators of honor killings that people engaging in these behaviors deserve punishment.

In the Roman Empire the Roman law Lex Julia de adulteriis coercendis implemented by Augustus Caesar permitted the murder of daughters and their lovers who committed adultery at the hands of their fathers and also permitted the murder of the adulterous wife's lover at the hand of her husband.

Provocation in English law and related laws on adultery in English law, as well as Article 324 of the French penal code of 1810 were legal concepts which allowed for reduced punishment for the murder committed by a husband against his wife and her lover if the husband had caught them in the act of adultery. On 7 November 1975, Law no. 617/75 Article 17 repealed the 1810 French Penal Code Article 324. The 1810 penal code Article 324 passed by Napoleon was copied by Middle Eastern Arab countries. It inspired Jordan's Article 340 which permitted the murder of a wife and her lover if caught in the act at the hands of her husband (today the article provides for mitigating circumstances). France's 1810 Penal Code Article 324 also inspired the 1858 Ottoman Penal Code's Article 188, both the French Article 324 and Ottoman article 188 were drawn on to create Jordan's Article 340 which was retained even after a 1944 revision of Jordan's laws which did not touch public conduct and family law; article 340 still applies to this day in a modified form. France's Mandate over Lebanon resulted in its penal code being imposed there in 1943–1944, with the French-inspired Lebanese law for adultery allowing the mere accusation of adultery against women resulting in a maximum punishment of two years in prison while men have to be caught in the act and not merely accused, and are punished with only one year in prison.

France's Article 324 inspired laws in other Arab countries such as:

- Algeria's 1991 Penal Code Article 279
- Egypt's 1937 Penal Code no. 58 Article 237
- Iraq's 1969 Penal Code no. 111 Article 409
  - Leniency provision removed in the Kurdistan Region by the Kurdistan Parliament in 2002
- Jordan's 1960 Penal Code no. 16 Article 340
- Kuwait's Penal Code Article 153
  - Repealed by decree in March 2025
- Lebanon's Penal Code Articles 193, 252, 253 and 562
  - These were amended in 1983, 1994, 1995, 1996, and 1999 and were eventually repealed by the Lebanese Parliament on 4 August 2011
- Libya's Penal Code Article 375
- Morocco's 1963 amended Penal Code Article 418
- Oman's Penal Code Article 252
- Palestine, which had two codes: Jordan's 1960 Penal Code 1960 in the West Bank and British Mandate Criminal Code Article 18 in the Gaza Strip
  - These were respectively repealed by Article 1 and Article 2 and both by Article 3 of the 2011 Law no. 71 which was signed on 5 May 2011 by president Mahmoud Abbas into the 10 October 2011 Official Gazette no. 91 applying in the Criminal Code of Palestine's Northern Governorates and Southern Governorates
- Syria's 1953 amended 1949 Penal Code Article 548
  - Repealed by the People's Council on 12 March 2020
- Tunisia's 1991 Penal Code Article 207 (which was repealed)
- United Arab Emirate's law no.3/1978 Article 334
- Yemen's law no. 12/1994 Article 232

In Pakistan, the law was based upon on the 1860 Indian Penal Code (IPC) implemented by the colonial authorities in British India, which allowed for mitigation of punishment for charges of assault or criminal force in the case of a "grave and sudden provocation". This clause was used to justify the legal status of honor killing in Pakistan, although the IPC makes no mention of it. In 1990, the Pakistani government reformed this law to bring it in terms with the Shari'a, and the Pakistani Federal Shariat Court declared that "according to the teachings of Islam, provocation, no matter how grave and sudden it is, does not lessen the intensity of crime of murder". However, Pakistani judges still sometimes hand down lenient sentences for honor killings, justified by still citing the IPC's mention of a "grave and sudden provocation."

== Motives ==
=== Refusal of an arranged or forced marriage ===
Refusal of an arranged marriage or forced marriage is often a cause of an honor killing. The family that has prearranged the marriage risks disgrace if the marriage does not proceed, and the betrothed is indulged in a relationship with another individual without prior knowledge of the family members.

=== Seeking a divorce ===
A woman attempting to obtain a divorce or separation without the consent of the husband/extended family can also be a trigger for honor killings. In cultures where marriages are arranged and goods are often exchanged between families, a woman's desire to seek a divorce is often viewed as an insult to the men who negotiated the deal. By making their marital problems known outside the family, the women are seen as exposing the family to public dishonor.

=== Allegations and rumors about a family member ===
In certain cultures, an allegation against a woman can be enough to tarnish her family's reputation, and to trigger an honor killing: the family's fear of being ostracized by the community is enormous.

=== Victims of rape ===
In many cultures, victims of rape face severe violence, including honor killings, from their families and relatives. In many parts of the world, women whom men have raped are considered to have brought 'dishonor' or 'disgrace' to their families. This is especially the case if the victim becomes pregnant.

Central to the code of honor, a woman's virginity, in many societies must be preserved until marriage.

=== Homosexuality or gender transition ===
Both homosexuality and gender transition have also been claimed as grounds for honor killing by relatives. Individuals participating in same-sex activity, engaging in behaviors that are regarded as inappropriate gender expression (e.g. acting or dressing in an "effeminate way"), or living their lives as transgender have been made victims of honor violence.

In one case, a gay Jordanian man was shot and wounded by his brother. In another case, in 2008, a homosexual Turkish-Kurdish student, Ahmet Yıldız, was shot outside a cafe and later died in the hospital. Sociologists have called this Turkey's first publicized gay honor killing. In 2012, a 17-year-old gay youth was murdered by his father in Turkey in the southeastern province of Diyarbakır.

Numerous transgender women have been victims of honor killings, including a case noted by international authorities where an estranged family member flew across continents to kill his transgender sister.

The United Nations High Commissioner for Refugees states that "claims made by LGBT persons often reveal exposure to physical and sexual violence, extended periods of detention, medical abuse, the threat of execution and honor killing."

A 2019 study found that antigay "honor" abuse found more support in four surveyed Asian countries (India, Iran, Malaysia, and Pakistan) and among Asian British people than in a White British sample. The study also found that women and younger people were less likely to support such "honor" abuse. Muslims and Hindus were substantially more likely to approve of "honor" abuse than Christians or Buddhists, who scored lowest of the examined religious groups.

=== Forbidden male partners ===
In many honor-based cultures, a woman maintains her honor through modesty. If a man violates a woman's modesty—such as through dating or having sex with her, especially if she was a virgin—the man has dishonored the woman, even if the relationship is consensual. Thus to restore the woman's lost honor, male members of her family will beat and murder the offender. Sometimes, violence extends to the offender's family members, since honor feud attacks are seen as family conflicts. In one case, a 16-year-old British Bangladeshi schoolboy from Blackburn, Lancashire was abducted and attacked by his Pakistani girlfriend's uncle, father, cousin and brother for dating her in an 'Honour Beating'.

=== Outside the caste relations ===
Some cultures have very strong caste social systems, based on social stratification characterized by endogamy, hereditary transmission of a style of life which often includes an occupation, ritual status in a hierarchy, customary social interaction, and exclusion based on cultural notions of purity and pollution. The caste system in India is such an example. In such cultures, it is often expected that one marries and forms closed associations only within one's caste, and avoids lower castes. When these rules are violated, this can result in violence, including honor killings.

=== Socializing outside the home ===
In some cultures, women are expected to have a primarily domestic role. Such ideas are often based on practices like purdah. Purdah is a religious and social practice of female seclusion prevalent among some Muslim (especially South Asian) and Hindu communities; it often requires having women stay indoors, the avoiding of socialization between men and women, and full body covering of women, such as burqa and hijab. When these rules are violated, including by dressing in a way deemed inappropriate or displaying behavior seen as disobedient, the family may respond with violence up to honor killings.

=== Renouncing or changing religion and interfaith relations ===
Violating religious dogma, such as changing or renouncing religion can trigger honor killings. Marriage or relations between people of different religions can result in violence and murder.

== Substitutes ==
=== Forced suicide ===
A forced suicide may be a substitute for an honor killing. In this case, the family members do not directly murder the victim themselves, but force them to commit suicide, in order to avoid punishment. Such suicides are reported to be common in southeastern Turkey. It was reported that in 2001, 565 women lost their lives in honor-related crimes in Ilam, Iran, of which 375 were allegedly staged as self-immolation. In 2008, self-immolation "occurred in all the areas of Kurdish settlement, where it was more common than in other parts of Iran". It is claimed that in Iraqi Kurdistan many deaths are reported as "female suicides" in order to conceal honor-related crimes.

=== Forced marriage ===
In the case of an unmarried woman or girl associating herself with a man, losing virginity, or being raped, the family may attempt to restore its honor with a "shotgun wedding". The groom will usually be the man who has 'dishonored' the woman or girl, but if this is not possible the family may try to arrange a marriage with another man, often a man who is part of the extended family of the one who has committed the acts with the woman or girl. This being an alternative to an honor killing, the woman or girl has no choice but to accept the marriage. The family of the man is expected to cooperate and provide a groom for the woman.

== Extent ==
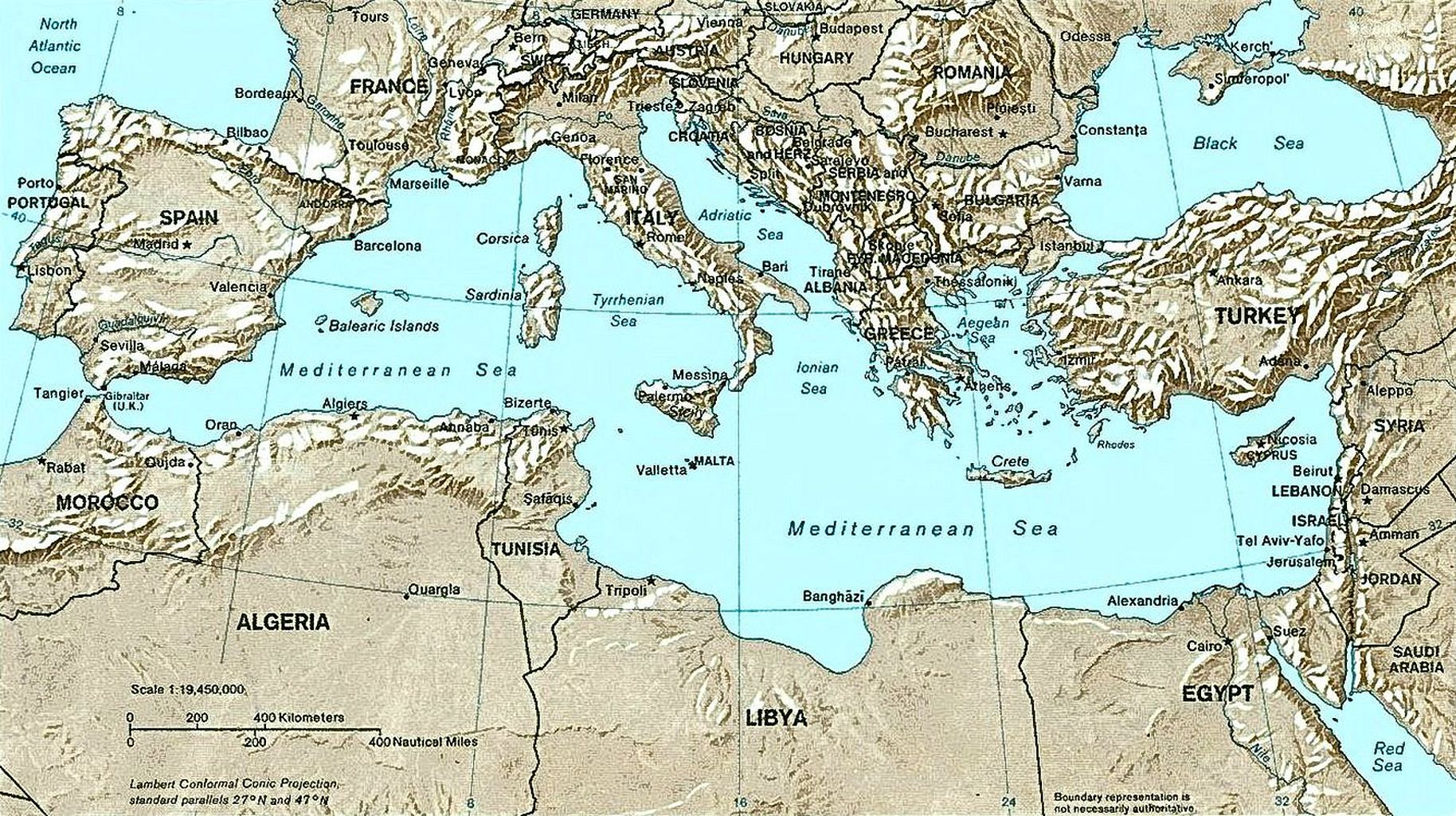
One of the world regions with a long tradition of honor-based violence is the Mediterranean

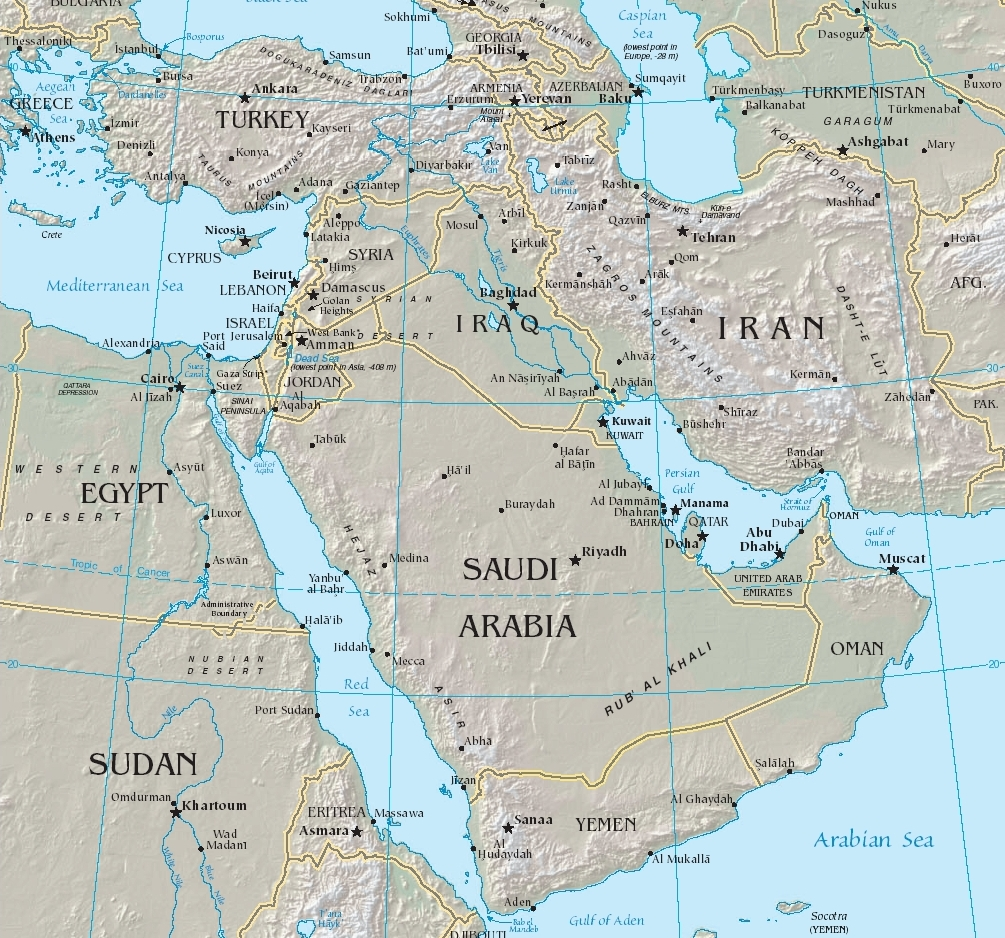
The Middle East, a region where many honor killings occur

The Indian subcontinent, a region where honor killings also occur, namely by reasons of caste

Reliable figures of honor killings are hard to obtain, in large part because "honor" is either improperly defined or is defined in ways other than in Article 12 of the UDHR without a clear follow-up explanation. As a result, criteria are hardly ever given for objectively determining whether a given case is an instance of honor killing. Because of the lack of both a clear definition of "honor" and coherent criteria, it is often presupposed that more women than men are victims of honor killings, and victim counts often contain women exclusively.

Honor killings occur in many parts of the world, but are most widely reported in the Middle East, South Asia and North Africa. They also occur in regions such as East Africa, Chechnya, and Latin America. Historically, honor killings were also common in Southern Europe, until relatively recently. Generational family feuds resulting in murders continue to take place in Sardinia in the 21st century.

In French culture, stories about such homicides were romanticized and featured prominently in French literature of the 19th century, and "In literature as in life, unconventional women needed to be severely punished lest their defiant attitudes inspire further acts of rebellion". In Corsica, there was a strong custom of vendetta, which required Corsicans to murder anyone who wronged their family honor. Between 1821 and 1852 approximately 4,300 vendetta killings were perpetrated in Corsica.

=== Historical ===
Matthew A. Goldstein, J.D. (Arizona), has noted that honor killings were encouraged in ancient Rome, where male family members who did not take action against the female adulterers in their families were "actively persecuted".

Honor killings and the control of women is evidenced throughout history in the cultures and traditions of many regions. The Roman law of pater familias gave complete control to the men of the family over both children and wives. Under ancient Roman law, women who were found guilty of adultery could be killed by their husbands. During the Qing dynasty in China, fathers and husbands had the right to kill daughters who were deemed to have dishonored the family.

Among the Indigenous Aztecs and Incas, adultery was punishable by death. During John Calvin's rule of Geneva, women found guilty of adultery were punished by being drowned in the Rhône.

Among the Spanish colonies in the New World, women were viewed as "dishonoring" their husbands by committing adultery, which sometimes led to their deaths via honor killing. One notable example of this happening was when Manuela de Andrade was murdered by her eldest stepson for "dishonoring" his father by engaging in prostitution, in modern-day Cartagena, Colombia. However, the honor killing of doña Manuela was not legal under Spanish law, unlike in other regions of the world during this time. As evidenced by the subsequent murder trial that found all three accomplices- doña Manuela's husband and two stepsons- guilty for their role in Manuela de Andrade's death.

Honor killings have a long tradition in Mediterranean Europe. According to the Honour Related Violence – European Resource Book and Good Practice (page 234): "Honor in the Mediterranean world is a code of conduct, a way of life and an ideal of the social order, which defines the lives, the customs and the values of many of the peoples in the Mediterranean moral".

=== By region ===
According to the UN in 2002:

The report of the Special Rapporteur... concerning cultural practices in the family that are violent towards women (E/CN.4/2002/83), indicated that honor killings had been reported in Egypt, Jordan, Lebanon (the Lebanese Parliament abolished the Honor killing in August 2011), Morocco, Pakistan, the Syrian Arab Republic, Turkey, Yemen, and other Mediterranean and Persian Gulf countries, and that they had also taken place in western countries such as France, Germany and the United Kingdom, within migrant communities.

In addition, the United Nations Commission on Human Rights gathered reports from several countries and considering only the countries that submitted reports it was shown that honor killings have occurred in Bangladesh, the United Kingdom, Brazil, Ecuador, Egypt, India, Israel, Italy, Jordan, Pakistan, Morocco, Sweden, Turkey, and Uganda.

== Support and sanction ==
Actions of Pakistani police officers and judges (particularly at the lower level of the judiciary) have, in the past, seemed to support the act of honor killings in the name of family honor. Police enforcement, in situations of admitted murder, does not always take action against the perpetrator. Also, judges in Pakistan (particularly at the lower level of the judiciary), rather than ruling cases with gender equality in mind, also seem to reinforce inequality and in some cases sanction the murder of women considered dishonorable. Often, a suspected honor killing never even reaches court, but in cases where they do, the alleged killer is often not charged or is given a reduced sentence of three to four years in jail. In a case study of 150 honor killings, the proceeding judges rejected only eight claims that the women were murdered for the honor. The rest were sentenced lightly. In many cases in Pakistan, one of the reasons honor killing cases never make it to the courts, is because, according to some lawyers and women's right activists, Pakistani law enforcement do not get involved. Under the encouragement of the killer, police often declare the killing as a domestic case that warrants no involvement. In other cases, the women and victims are too afraid to speak up or press charges. Police officials, however, claim that these cases are never brought to them, or are not major enough to be pursued on a large scale.

In Pakistan, honor killings are often met with indifference because of a deep-rooted gender bias built into the law, the police, and the courts. In a September 1999 report called "Pakistan: Honor Killings of Girls and Women", Amnesty International criticized governmental indifference and called for state responsibility in protecting human rights of female victims. To elaborate, Amnesty strongly requested the Government of Pakistan to take 1) legal, 2) preventive, and 3) protective measures. Amnesty asked the Government of Pakistan to take three kinds of action: legal, preventative, and protective.

Legal action meant changing the country's criminal laws to guarantee women equal protection, and making sure that victims of honor crimes can reach the justice system. Preventative action meant raising public awareness through media, education, and public announcements. Protective measures meant keeping activists, layer, and women's groups safe as they work to end honor killings and creating more support services for victims, such as shelters.

Kremlin-appointed Chechen president Ramzan Kadyrov said that honor killings were perpetrated on those who deserved to die. He said that those who are killed have "loose morals" and are rightfully shot by relatives in honor killings. He did not vilify women alone but added that "If a woman runs around and if a man runs around with her, both of them are killed."

In 2007, Tor Erling Staff (1933 - 2018), a lawyer who worked for the Supreme Court of Norway, stated that he wanted the punishment reduced from 17 years in prison to 15 years in the case of honor killings that took place in Norway. He explained that the Norwegian public did not understand other cultures who practiced honor killings, or understand their thinking, and that Norwegian culture "is self-righteous".

In 2008, Israr Ullah Zehri, a Pakistani politician in Balochistan, defended the honor killings of five women belonging to the Umrani tribe by a relative of a local Umrani politician. Zehri defended the murdering in Parliament and asked his fellow legislators not to make a fuss about the incident. He said, "These are centuries-old traditions, and I will continue to defend them. Only those who indulge in immoral acts should be afraid."

Nilofar Bakhtiar, who was Minister for Tourism and Advisor to Pakistan Prime Minister on Women's Affairs, campaigned against honor killings in Pakistan while in office.

=== National legal codes ===
Legislation on this issue varies, but the vast majority of countries no longer allow a husband to legally murder a wife for adultery (although adultery itself continues to be punishable by death in some countries) or to commit other forms of honor killings. However, in many places, adultery and other "immoral" sexual behaviors by female family members can be considered mitigating circumstances in the case when they are murdered, leading to significantly shorter sentences. Legal scholar Lama Abu-Odeh found that, as of the mid-1980s, none of the Arab penal codes with honor provisions excused the killings most typical of honor-based societies, such as the killing of a woman found not to be a virgin on her wedding night or of an unmarried woman found to be pregnant, and that the codes generally required the killer to have caught the woman in the act and killed her immediately. Several of these provisions have since been amended or repealed.

Today's laws which allow for mitigating circumstances or acquittals for men who murder female family members due to sexual behaviors are, mostly trace back to the French Napoleonic Code (France's own "crime of passion" law, stayed in force until 1975). The Middle East, including the Arab countries of North Africa, and non-Arab minorities within Arabic countries, have high recorded level of honor crimes, and these regions are the most likely to have laws that fully or partly excuse honor killings. However, laws which provide leniency for honor killings do not come from Islamic law, but from the penal codes of the Napoleonic Empire.

Compared to other Western countries, French culture shows more public tolerance for such crimes among the public, compared to other Western countries; and indeed, recent surveys have shown the French public to be more accepting of these practices than the public in other countries. One 2008 Gallup survey compared the views of the French, German and British public and those of French, German and British Muslims on several social issues: 4% of the French public said "honor killings" were "morally acceptable" and 8% of the French public said "crimes of passion" were "morally acceptable"; honor killings were seen as acceptable by 1% of German public and also 1% of the British public; crimes of passion were seen as acceptable by 1% of German public and 2% of the British public. Among Muslims, 5% in Paris, 3% in Berlin, and 3% in London saw honor killings as acceptable, and 4% in Paris (less than the French public), 1% in Berlin, and 3% in London saw crimes of passion as acceptable.

According to the report of the United Nations Special Rapporteur submitted to the 58th session of the United Nations Commission on Human Rights in 2002 concerning cultural practices in the family that reflect violence against women (E/CN.4/2002/83):

The Special Rapporteur indicated that there had been contradictory decisions with regard to the honor defense in Brazil, and that legislative provisions allowing for partial or complete defence in that context could be found in the penal codes of Argentina, Ecuador, Egypt, Guatemala, Iran, Israel, Jordan, Peru, Syria, Venezuela and the Palestinian National Authority.

As of 2022, most countries with complete or partial defenses for murdering due to sexual behaviors or parental disobedience are MENA countries, but there are some notable exceptions, namely the Philippines. The legal aspects of honor killings in different countries are discussed below:

- Yemen: laws effectively exonerate fathers who murder their children; also the blood money paid for murdered women is less than that for murdered males.
- Iran: Article 630 exempts a husband from punishment if he murders his wife upon discovering them in the act of adultery; article 301 stipulates that a father and paternal grandfather are not to be retaliated (but imprisoned) against for murdering their child/grandchild.
- Jordan: Article 340 of the 1960 Penal Code originally exempted from punishment a man who killed his wife or a female relative caught committing adultery; it has since been amended, but still allows mitigated sentences for those who kill a spouse discovered committing adultery. In practice, courts often relied instead on Article 98, which reduces sentences for crimes committed "in a fit of fury"; legal scholar Lama Abu-Odeh documents this practice from 1964 onward, including in cases involving an illegitimate pregnancy. In August 2017, Parliament amended Article 98 to disallow mitigated sentences for crimes against women. Article 99, which allows sentences to be halved when the victim's family waives its claim, has also been used to reduce penalties in such cases.
- Syria: Article 548 of the 1949 Penal Code formerly exempted from punishment a man who killed his wife or a female relative caught committing adultery or "illegitimate sexual acts". It was amended in 2009 to require a minimum of two years' imprisonment, raised to five to seven years by Legislative Decree No. 1 of 2011, and repealed by the People's Council on 12 March 2020. Article 192, which allows a judge to reduce a sentence or exempt the offender where the motive is deemed "honorable", was not repealed. Article 242 allows sentence reductions for crimes committed in rage caused by an unlawful act of the victim.
- In Brazil, an explicit defense to murder in case of adultery has never been part of the criminal code, but a defense of "honor" (not part of the criminal code) has been widely used by lawyers in such cases to obtain acquittals. Although this defense has been generally rejected in urbanized areas since the 1950s, it has been very successful in the interior of the country. In 1991 Brazil's Supreme Court explicitly rejected the "honor" defense as having no basis in Brazilian law.
- Turkey: In Turkey, persons found guilty of this crime are sentenced to life in prison. In practice however, younger male family members are sometimes pushed to murder because their sentences are much shorter. There are well documented cases, where Turkish courts have sentenced whole families to life imprisonment for an honor killing. For example, on 13 January 2009, a Turkish court sentenced five members of the same Kurdish family to life imprisonment for the honor killing of Naile Erdas, 16, who got pregnant as a result of rape.
- Pakistan: Honor killings are known as karo kari (Sindhi: ڪارو ڪاري) (Urdu: کاروکاری). The practice is supposed to be prosecuted as an ordinary killing, but in practice police and prosecutors often ignore it. Often, a man who has committed murder must simply claim it was for his honor and he will avoid punishment. Nilofar Bakhtiar, an advisor to Prime Minister Shaukat Aziz, stated that as many as 1,261 women were murdered in honor killings in 2003. The Hudood Ordinances, enacted in 1979 by President Muhammad Zia-ul-Haq, had the effect of reducing legal protections for women, especially regarding sex outside marriage. This law made it much riskier for women to come forward with accusations of rape. On 8 December 2004, under international and domestic pressure, Pakistan enacted a new law that made honor killings punishable by a prison term of seven years, or by the death penalty in the most extreme cases. In 2006, the Women's Protection Bill amended the Hudood Ordinances. In 2016, Pakistan repealed a loophole which allowed the perpetrators of honor killings to avoid punishment by seeking forgiveness for the crime from another family member, and thus be legally pardoned. Hundreds of women are murdered by family members in Pakistan each year in so-called "honour" killings for violating conservative norms governing women's relationships.
- Egypt: Several studies on honor crimes by The Centre of Islamic and Middle Eastern Law, at the School of Oriental and African Studies in London, includes one which reports on Egypt's legal system, noting a gender bias in favor of men in general, and notably article 17 of the Penal Code: judicial discretion to allow reduced punishment in certain circumstance, often used in honor killings case.
- Haiti: In 2005, the laws were changed, abolishing the right of a husband to be excused for murdering his wife due to adultery. Adultery was also decriminalized.
- Uruguay: until December 2017, article 36 of the Penal Code provided for the exoneration for murder of a spouse due to "the passion provoked by adultery". The case of violence against women in Uruguay has been debated in the context that it is otherwise a liberal country; nevertheless, domestic violence is a very serious problem; according to a 2018 United Nations study, Uruguay has the second-highest rate of killings of women by current or former partners in Latin America, after the Dominican Republic. Despite having a reputation of being a progressive country, Uruguay has lagged behind with regard to its approach to domestic violence; for example, in Chile, considered one of the most socially conservative countries of the region, similar legislation permitting such honor killings was repealed in 1953. Uruguay's honor culture has been prominent well into the 20th century.
- The Philippines: murdering one's spouse upon being caught in the act of adultery or one's daughter upon being caught in the act of premarital sex is punished by destierro, or banishment from a geographical area for a period of time (Art. 247). The penalty for a woman killing her own child less than three days old also carries a reduced penalty if the killing is done in order to conceal her dishonor under Article 255 of the Revised Penal Code. Normally, the act of killing one's spouse or child is punishable by reclusion perpetua or imprisonment from 20 years and 1 day to 40 years under Article 246 of the Revised Penal Code for the crime of parricide, although any homicide may benefit from the general mitigating circumstances provided for crimes (see Article 13). The Philippines maintains several other traditionalist laws: besides Vatican City, it is the only other country in the world that bans divorce; it is one of 20 countries that still has a marry-your-rapist law; and it is one of the few non-Muslim majority countries to have a criminal law against adultery, one which also defines and punishes adultery more severely if committed by women (see articles 333 and 334). These laws are based on old Spanish laws that were repealed in Spain in 1963 (the honor killing law) and in 1978 (the adultery law). The origin of Philippine's "marry-your-rapist law" can be traced to the Napoleonic French Code (the "marry-your-rapist law" was in force in France until 1994), a code which has influenced directly or indirectly many legal codes of the world, because at the time of its enactment it was associated with modernization. In addition to honor killings, Philippine has also received international criticism for extrajudicial killings and forced disappearances in the Philippines, which have been openly encouraged by the government.

=== International response ===
The Istanbul Convention, the first legally binding international instrument on violence against women, prohibits honor killings. Countries listed in blue on the map are members to this convention, and, as such, have the obligation to outlaw honor killings.

Honor killings are condemned as a serious human rights violation and are addressed by several international instruments.

Honor killings are opposed by United Nations General Assembly Resolution 55/66 (adopted in 2000) and subsequent resolutions, which have generated various reports.

The Council of Europe Convention on preventing and combating violence against women and domestic violence, or the Istanbul Convention, addresses this issue. Article 42 reads:

Article 42 – Unacceptable justifications for crimes, including crimes committed in the name of so-called honor

1. Parties shall take the necessary legislative or other measures to ensure that, in criminal proceedings initiated following the commission of any of the acts of violence covered by the scope of this Convention, culture, custom, religion, tradition, or so-called honor shall not be regarded as justification for such acts. This covers, in particular, claims that the victim has transgressed cultural, religious, social, or traditional norms or customs of appropriate behavior.

2. Parties shall take the necessary legislative or other measures to ensure that incitement by any person of a child to commit any of the acts referred to in paragraph 1 shall not diminish the criminal liability of that person for the acts committed.

The World Health Organization (WHO) addressed the issue of honor killings and stated: "Murders of women to 'save the family honor' are among the most tragic consequences and explicit illustrations of embedded, culturally accepted discrimination against women and girls." According to the UNODC: "Honour crimes, including killing, are one of history's oldest forms of gender-based violence. It assumes that a woman's behavior casts a reflection on the family and the community. ... In some communities, a father, brother, or cousin will publicly take pride in a murder committed to preserving the 'honor' of a family. In some such cases, local justice officials may side with the family and take no formal action to prevent similar deaths."

== Notable victims ==
- Tursunoy Saidazimova, an Uzbek actress in the Uzbek SSR and one of the first to sing onstage without a face-veil. She was murdered by her husband shortly after her career took off.
- Nurkhon Yuldashkhojayeva, one of the first Uzbek actresses and one of the first Uzbek women to dance onstage without a paranja. She was stabbed to death by her brother.
- Udumalai Shankar
- Tina Isa, a 16-year-old American teenager stabbed and murdered by her parents for having an affair with an African American man.
- Rukhsana Naz, a 19-year-old British Pakistani mother-of-two from Normanton, Derby, who was murdered by family members.
- Surjit Athwal, a 27-year-old British-Indian woman murdered in India. Her murder was instigated by her mother-in-law and in collusion with Surjit's husband.
- Tulay Goren, a 15-year-old Kurdish schoolgirl from Woodford Green, East London who went missing in January 1999. In December 2009, her father Mehmet Goren was convicted of her murder. Mehmet killed Tulay because of she was in a relationship with an older man, from a different branch of the Islamic faith.
- Samia Sarwar, a Pakistani woman who was shot dead in her lawyers' office in Lahore by an assassin hired by her own parents.
- Jaswinder Kaur Sidhu, an Indo-Canadian beautician who was kidnapped, tortured, and killed in India on orders of her mother and uncle as punishment for her secret marriage.
- Nitish Katara, a 23-year-old Indian business executive in Delhi who was murdered by Vikas Yadav because the latter's family did not approve of the former's relationship with Bharti Yadav, sister of Vikas Yadav.
- Fadime Şahindal, a Kurdish immigrant moved to Sweden who was murdered by her father in front of her mother and two sisters.
- Heshu Yones, a 16-year-old Iraqi Kurd teenager from Acton, London who was murdered by her father for becoming too "westernised" and for engaging in a relationship against his orders. Heshu's case was the first in the United Kingdom to be legally recognised and prosecuted as an honor killing.
- Shafilea Ahmed, a 17-year-old British Pakistani girl who was murdered by her parents due to her refusal to accept an arranged marriage.
- Hatun Sürücü, a Kurdish-Turkish woman living in Germany was murdered by her youngest brother. Sürücü had divorced the cousin she had been forced to marry at the age of 16, and was reportedly dating a German man.
- Samaira Nazir, a 25-year-old British Pakistani woman who was murdered by her brother and cousin for refusing to enter into an arranged marriage and for rejecting her parents' choices of suitors from Pakistan.
- Ghazala Khan, a Danish woman of Pakistani descent, who was shot and killed in Denmark by her brother after she had married against the will of her family.
- Banaz Mahmod, a 20-year-old Iraqi Kurdish woman who lived in Mitcham, South London murdered on the orders of her family because she ended a violent and abusive forced marriage and started a relationship with someone of her own choosing. Her story was chronicled in the 2012 documentary film Banaz: A Love Story.
- Hina Saleem, a Pakistani woman resident in Italy who was killed by her father due to her Western boyfriend and her father instead wanted her in an arranged marriage.
- Manoj and Babli, two Indian newlyweds kidnapped and murdered. The accused in the murder included relatives of Babli, like her grandfather, brother, two cousins, maternal and paternal uncles.
- Sadia Sheikh, a 20-year-old Belgian woman of Pakistani heritage was fatally shot by her brother in Lodelinsart, Charleroi after her parents pressured her to marry a cousin whom she had never met. The case has been called Belgium's first honor killing trial.
- Aqsa Parvez, a high school student strangled and murdered by her brother and father in Mississauga, Ontario, Canada.
- Morsal Obeidi, a German-Afghan girl who was killed by her brother in Hamburg, Germany.
- Rand Abdel-Qader, a student at Basra University killed by her father because she had formed a friendship with a British soldier stationed in the city.
- Sandeela Kanwal, a Pakistani woman living in the Atlanta metropolitan area in Clayton County, Georgia, who was murdered by her father.
- Aasiya Zubair, a Muslim Pakistani American MBA student was stabbed and decapitated by her ex-husband Muzzammil Hassan in Bridges TV station in Orchard Park, New York.
- Coty Beavers, a 28-year-old man killed by his wife's father.
- Qandeel Baloch, a 26-year-old Pakistani model who was strangled while she slept in her parents' house in Multan. Her brother confessed to the murder saying she was "bringing disrepute" to the "family's honour".
- Noor Almaleki, a 20-year-old Iraqi American student in Arizona who was fatally run over by her father for rejecting an arranged marriage and dating a man of her own choosing
- Siran Jaan, Begum Jaan, and Bazeegha, three Pakistani girls who were condemned to death by a local jirga and murdered after footage of them engaging in "free mixing" at a wedding emerged.

== See also ==
- Anomie
- Authoritarian personality
- Blood atonement
- Blood feud
- Bride burning
- Bride kidnapping
- Child murder
- Children's rights
- Chastisement
- Chronicle of a Death Foretold
- Corporal punishment
- Corrective rape
- Crimes against humanity
- Domestic violence
- Face (sociological concept)
- Family values
- Filicide
- Femicide
- Female infanticide
- Fetal abduction
- Forced marriage
- Gendercide
- Guilt–shame–fear spectrum of cultures
- Hate crime
- Homophobia
- Honor suicide
- Izzat (honour)
- Ka-Mer
- Kiri-sute gomen
- Krvna osveta
- Lynching
- Memini
- Namus
- Paternalism
- Premarital sex
- Pregnancy-associated femicide
- Placement marriage
- Religious violence
- Sati (practice)
- Son preference
- Shotgun wedding
- Slut-shaming
- Transfemicide
- Violence against LGBT people
- Violence against women
- Women's rights
- Women in the Victorian era
- Youth rights
