= Murder of Shafilea Ahmed =

2003 honour killing in Warrington, England

Shafilea Ahmed
- Undated photograph of Ahmed
- Born: Shafilea Iftikhar Ahmed; 14 July 1986; Bradford, West Yorkshire, England
- Died: 11 September 2003 (aged 17); Warrington, Cheshire, England
- Cause of death: Suffocation
- Body discovered: February 2004; Sedgwick, Cumbria, England
- Resting place: Fox Covert Cemetery, Warrington
- Known for: Honour killing victim

Shafilea Iftikhar Ahmed (Punjabi and Urdu: شفیلیہ افتخار احمد; 14 July 1986 – 11 September 2003) was a British-Pakistani girl who was murdered by her parents in an honour killing at the age of 17 due to her refusal to accept a forced marriage.

Seven years later, Ahmed's sister told police that she had been murdered by her parents, who were imprisoned for a minimum of 25 years in August 2012. The possibility of other individuals having helped her parents to dispose of their daughter's body has been raised; after the parents' trial, the chief executive of the Bradford Council for Mosques encouraged anybody with information about the case to come forward with information to assist the police.

== Background ==
Shafilea's father, Iftikhar Ahmed, was born in the village of Uttam in the Gujrat District of Pakistan. He is a native Punjabi speaker who migrated to England with his family when he was 10 years old. He later visited Denmark, where he went to a party and met Danish woman Vivi Lone Anderson, who was a Christian. They were married in a civil ceremony in Copenhagen in 1980, and later had a son named Tony. His family, particularly some of his male relatives, did not accept his relationship with Anderson. The family remained in good spirits until Iftikhar returned to Pakistan at the request of his family five years later due to the death of his mother. In 1985, he was forced into an arranged marriage by his family with his cousin, Farzana Ahmed, who threatened to commit suicide if he refused to marry her.

After the wedding, Iftikhar called Anderson to tell her that he was returning to England and asked her to move in with him. He did not tell her that he had taken a second wife. The newlyweds moved into a predominantly Asian area of Bradford. Iftikhar and Farzana, who was by then heavily pregnant, had already moved in together when Anderson arrived. Iftikhar then admitted that he married Farzana as their marriage had been planned by their family as children. Upset, Anderson filed for divorce and left the apartment the same month she had entered England. Iftikhar and Anderson fell out of contact until Iftikhar called to tell her that Farzana was giving birth to a daughter. Iftikhar told her that if he and Farzana had a girl, he would not allow her to grow up "without strict Islamic guidance". As soon as Iftikhar married Farzana, he distanced himself from the Western culture he had formerly enjoyed.

Shafilea "Shaf" Ahmed was born on 14 July 1986 in Bradford. The family later moved to the Great Sankey area of Warrington. Shafilea attended Great Sankey High School, Barrowhall College, and Priestley College from September 2003. She was an A-Level student and hoped to become a solicitor.

Growing up, Shafilea suffered physical and emotional child abuse. Her teacher reported seeing a bruise and a cut on her lip, which Shafilea attributed to a "beating" from her parents. In February 2003, Shafilea ran away from home and asked social services to help her find a place to live; she regarded herself as homeless and was placed in emergency hotel accommodation by Warrington Borough Council. When contacting social services, she said that she had experienced domestic violence from the age of 15, and this was reported to have escalated in the months before her death. On her council application, she stated that "one parent would hold [her] whilst the other hit [her]". Her application was also due to the fear of being abducted to Pakistan by her parents and subjected to a forced child marriage. The social services in question were later regarded as slow to help Shafilea.

During a trip to Pakistan in February 2003, Shafilea drank bleach in what was reported to be a suicide attempt. Her parents claimed this had been a simple mistake and that she had drunk the bleach during a power outage because she thought it was mouthwash, a claim prosecutors later called "a stupid and obvious lie". Shafilea suffered extensive damage to her throat, for which she was having regular care at the time of her disappearance. According to media reports, she had turned down a suitor in a forced marriage during this trip, although her parents denied there being any attempts made to pressure her into agreeing to the marriage.

== Murder ==
Shafilea disappeared on 11 September 2003, and had been missing for a week before her teachers informed the police. Subsequently, a major campaign urged anyone with information to come forward. Actress Shobna Gulati fronted the media campaign and read some of Shafilea's poems on television. A nationwide hunt was launched, but when Shafilea failed to seek treatment for her damaged throat, detectives became convinced she had been murdered in a possible honour killing connected to her rejection of her Pakistani suitor. Superintendent Geraint Jones told the Daily Mirror that "her family say a suitor had been found for her in Pakistan, but she was free to make her own decisions".

In February 2004, Shafilea's dismembered remains were found after heavy flooding in the River Kent near Sedgwick, Cumbria, some 70 miles (110 km) away from Warrington. Police said the corpse was deliberately hidden, and a gold "zigzag" bracelet and blue topaz ring found with the body were identified by her parents. Due to the advanced decomposition of her remains, the cause of death could not be determined by pathologist Alison Armer. Detective Sergeant Mike Foster stated at a hearing, "The pathologist could not determine the cause of death, but did say the body was that of a young female. Obviously, because of the condition of the body, she was unable to give any further findings." Police believe the body had probably been there since the day she disappeared or not long after. A second post mortem ordered by South Lakeland coroner Cyril Prickett failed to add anything further.

Inspector Mike Forrester of Cumbria Constabulary stated at an inquest hearing that "it was unclear whether all of Shafilea's body parts had been found" and that DNA tests "made it a one in a billion chance that the remains were those of anyone other than Shafilea". Shafilea's dentist said he was 90% sure that the lower jaw found was hers after examining the dental work carried out on it.

Shafilea's parents were released without charge after briefly having been arrested along with five other members of her extended family. Several of Shafilea's poems interested the police, notably "I Feel Trapped", which was interpreted as reflecting Shafilea's despairing emotional state. It described a hopeless life with a family who ignored her, and mentioned that she had run away from home several times. Shafilea's friend Sarah Bennett recalled an occasion when Shafilea had been branded a "slut" by her mother for dyeing her hair and wearing false nails. Neighbour Sheila Costello said, "She has been reported missing twice before and been found staying with friends. We heard they had an argument over an arranged marriage and that Shafi had run away. I hope nothing terrible has happened to her."

After three years, Cheshire Constabulary had not established a suspect, although eight members of Shafilea's extended family were arrested on suspicion of conspiracy to pervert the course of justice. Proceedings against them were dropped. An unidentified human hair not from members of her immediate family was reportedly found on Shafilea's foot. In January 2008, the coroner's inquest held that Shafilea had been the victim of a "vile murder".

== Trial and imprisonment of parents ==
On 25 August 2010, almost seven years after Shafilea's disappearance and murder, her younger sister Alesha arranged a robbery that took place at her parents' house when she, her brother, sisters, and parents were home. Alesha was arrested and revealed during a police interrogation that her parents had killed Shafilea. She told police that after trying to force Shafilea to accept the arranged marriage, her parents were afraid her refusal would bring shame on the family, so their father put a plastic bag in her mouth and suffocated her.

On 7 September 2011, Cheshire Police announced that Shafilea's parents had been charged with her murder. Their trial began at Chester Crown Court in May 2012, and they were both found guilty of murder and sentenced to life imprisonment with a minimum term of 25 years on 3 August 2012. Justice Roderick Evans said, "An expectation that she live in a sealed cultural environment separate from the culture of the country in which she lived was unrealistic, destructive, and cruel." Cheshire Police purposefully did not refer to the events as an "honour killing" because they do not legally recognise the term, clarifying that what had happened was simply murder.

After the trial, police were said to be looking into the possibility that Shafilea's parents had help when they dumped her body in 2003, and that they were looking into new information revealed during the trial. In August 2012, the chief executive of Bradford Council for Mosques encouraged anybody who knew about the case to come forward and said his group would help police.

== Aftermath ==
Following the conviction of Shafilea's parents, her close friend Melissa Powner read a statement outside the court:

We have waited for this day for many years. We have watched as her killers roamed free, yet today we heard those important words: words that have finally brought our friend the justice that she deserves. Shafilea was a caring, high-spirited and brave young lady who, even in her toughest times, always strove to remain positive and hopeful that she, too, would one day be able to live the peaceful and happy life she deserved. Shafilea was an extremely intelligent young lady who we have no doubt would have accomplished her personal ambitions of becoming a lawyer, yet this opportunity was unfairly snatched away from her. If there is one thing we pray will come from this, it is that her beautiful face and tragic story will inspire others to seek help to make them realise that this kind of vile treatment—no matter what culture or background someone is from—is not acceptable, and there is a way out.

On 14 July 2015, the first National Day of Memory for Victims of Honour Killings was held. Organised by the Leeds-based charity Karma Nirvana, it is held annually on Shafilea's birthday.

== See also ==
- Honour killings in the United Kingdom
- Honour killing in Pakistan
- List of solved missing person cases (2000s)

== Cited works and further reading ==
- Gill, Aisha K. (2014). "'All they think about is honour': The Murder of Shafilea Ahmed". In Gill, Aisha K.; Carolyn Strange; Karl Roberts (eds.). 'Honour' Killing and Violence: Theory, Policy and Practice. London: Palgrave Macmillan. doi:10.1057/9781137289568. ISBN 978-1-137-28956-8. - Print ISBN 978-1-137-28955-1 - PDF preview of chapter
- Julios, Christina (2016). Forced Marriage and 'Honour' Killings in Britain: Private Lives, Community Crimes and Public Policy Perspectives. London: Routledge. ISBN 978-1-317-13417-6.
- Rose, Jacqueline (2014). Women in Dark Times. London: Bloomsbury Publishing Plc. ISBN 978-1-408-84540-0.
