= Ertürk =

Ertürk is a Turkish surname. It may refer to:

- Aleyna Ertürk (born 2005), Turkish female fencer
- Alper Erturk (born 1982), Turkish engineer and academic
- Artun Ertürk (born 1971), Turkish musician, composer, lyricist and producer
- Helga Nadire İnan Ertürk (born 1984), Turkish German women's footballer
- Melisa Ertürk (born 1993), Turkish-Canadian women's footballer
- Yakin Ertürk, Turkish sociologist and UN Special Rapporteur
