= Murder of Tulay Goren =

1999 honour killing in London, England

Tulay Goren
- Born: March 1983; Elbistan, Turkey
- Died: 7 January 1999 (aged 15); Woodford Green, Greater London, England
- Citizenship: British
- Occupation: Student
- Known for: Honour killing victim

Tulay Goren (March 1983 – 7 January 1999) was a 15-year-old Kurdish schoolgirl from Woodford Green, East London who went missing in January 1999.

In December 2009, some ten years after her disappearance, her father Mehmet Goren was convicted of her murder. She was killed in a so-called honour killing because of her relationship with an older man, from a different branch of the Islamic faith. Mehmet Goren was sentenced to life imprisonment with a minimum term of 22 years. Tulay's body has never been found.

Goren's trial was the first time an expert witness in honour-based violence was called to give evidence in a British Court.

== Background ==
Tulay was born in Turkey in March 1983; she was one of four children born to Mehmet and Hanim Goren. Her family, of the Alevi branch of Islam, are Turkish Kurds who originate from Elbistan, Kahramanmaraş and who arrived in the United Kingdom as illegal immigrants in the mid-nineties, later claiming asylum.

Tulay's father Mehmet was a convicted criminal with alleged ties to the Kurdistan Workers' Party (PKK). He had served custodial sentences in both Saudi Arabia and Turkey prior to entering the United Kingdom. He was violent towards his wife and children and had earlier made attempts to kill them. He failed to adjust to his new life in the United Kingdom, refused to learn to speak English and adhered to what was described as the "feudal" culture existent in his home village.

Tulay attended Woodbridge High School, Woodford Green; described by a schoolfriend as a "sad" individual, who "only smiled or seemed happy when she spoke about [Unal]" (an older Turkish Kurd with whom Tulay had embarked on a relationship, as discussed under § Timeline below); she didn't talk about her home life. Coming close to being excluded for truanting and smoking, her elder sister said she was rebelling "in a big way", later stating "Tulay was caught in the middle of two clashing worlds. At home she was expected to be a dutiful Turkish daughter, while out of the family home she was exposed to a lifestyle that was completely at odds with her upbringing."

== Timeline ==
=== Pre-disappearance ===
During the school holidays of 1998, Tulay took a summer job at a clothing factory in Hackney, London where she met and then embarked on a relationship with Halil Unal. Unal, also a Turkish Kurd, was 15 years older than Tulay and from the Sunni branch of Islam; her family didn't approve, and Tulay was ordered to end the relationship.

After her summer job at the factory ended the couple maintained daily telephone contact; on 10 December 1998, Mehmet Goren went to Unal's place of work, assaulted him and warned him to stop "bothering" his daughter. Unal reported the assault but didn't press charges. On the same day, Tulay's family took her to the local police station and reported Unal for "pestering" her.

On 14 December 1998, Tulay ran away from home and went to live with Unal. After initially reporting her missing and reporting Unal for "unlawful sexual intercourse", the family changed track, agreed that the pair should get married, and a ceremony was scheduled for 21 December at Hackney Register Office. Despite Mehmet's attempts to bribe the registrar, the ceremony did not go ahead as Tulay, aged 15, was underage. A new date was set for 8 March 1999, when Tulay would've reached her 16th birthday.

The couple continued living together until 6 January 1999, when Tulay's father — claiming he objected to her sharing a home with Unal's male flatmate — forced her to return to the family home. He told Unal that she'd remain at home until he'd found somewhere suitable for the two of them to live.

=== Murder ===
Having forced Tulay to return home on 6 January, her father beat her, tied her up and drugged her with sleeping tablets. The following day he sent his wife and other children to stay with his brother overnight, telling her that he and Tulay had "things to talk about".

It is not known how she died, but police believe she was either smothered or strangled and then buried temporarily in the back garden of the family home before being moved to an unknown location.

=== Post-disappearance ===
When Hanim Goren returned to the family home following her overnight stay at the home of her brother-in-law, her husband told her that Tulay had run away.

Having already murdered his daughter, on 20 January 1999, Mehmet Goren arranged to meet Unal to discuss his and Tulay's future. Having lured him to the meeting, he attacked Unal with an axe. In the intervening period between Tulay's disappearance and the later murder trial, Mehmet Goren was convicted of grievous bodily harm for the axe attack on Unal and jailed for five years.

On 22 January 1999, Unal reported Tulay missing.

== Investigation ==
After initially corroborating her husband's story and maintaining that Tulay had run away, Hanim Goren was arrested on suspicion of perverting the course of justice and murder. On 23 March 1999, during a police interview, she admitted that she'd lied and that, although she hadn't witnessed her daughter's death, she believed that Mehmet had killed her. She noted that two kitchen knives, bin bags, and a washing line went missing after Tulay disappeared, that their garden had been dug up, and that her husband had visible injuries to his hands.

Hanim was prepared to testify against her husband but, without a body and a case heavily reliant on hearsay evidence, the Crown Prosecution Service declined to proceed. The investigation was further impeded by the familial "honour code" and a lack of awareness around "honour" crimes among British authorities at that time.

In 2007, the case was reinvestigated, as in the intervening period successful prosecutions had been brought in the "honour" killings of Heshu Yones and Banaz Mahmod, there was now a better understanding of honour-based violence, and criminal evidence reforms had changed the admissibility of hearsay evidence. On 25 November 2008, Mehmet Goren and his two brothers Ali and Cuma were arrested on suspicion of murder and conspiracy to murder. They were charged two days later.

== Legal proceedings ==
In October 2009, Mehmet Goren and his two brothers stood trial at the Old Bailey for the murder of Tulay and conspiracy to murder Halil Unal.

After initially insisting that Tulay had run away, Mehmet Goren changed his evidence and alleged that his elder brother Ali had ordered him to kill Tulay and Unal when their planned December marriage ceremony was unable to go ahead; he claimed that he'd refused and so Ali had taken Tulay away, suggesting Mehmet say that she'd been "handed over" to the PKK.

The prosecution case was that, as head of the family, Ali Goren would've been "key" in making the decision to kill Tulay and Unal. He denied any involvement, maintaining that he was "distant" from his brother and had been shunned when he tried to act as "peacemaker" between father and daughter.

Hanim Goren testified for the prosecution, relaying the events of 6 and 7 January 1999 and her suspicions after she returned home and Tulay was missing. She spoke of missing items, such as bin bags and knives, and stains on the clothing Mehmet had been wearing the day Tulay disappeared. She claimed that the garden had been dug up and some of Tulay's belongings had been destroyed, and said her husband stated "From now on she's gone. I disown her. She is not my child any more. From now on we do not have four children any more. We will only have three children."

Halil Unal gave evidence from behind a screen, testifying that Tulay had called him the day after she was forced to go home, warning him: "don't come over. They are trying to lure you into a trap.' He spoke of Mehmet attacking him with an axe after tricking him into attending a meeting at a pub some two weeks after Tulay was last seen.

Expert in "honour" crimes, Professor Yakin Ertürk, gave evidence in what was the first use of expert witnesses in a case of this kind in the United Kingdom.

Mehmet Goren was found guilty of murder on 17 December 2009 and sentenced to life imprisonment, with a minimum tariff of 22 years. He was acquitted of conspiring to murder Halil Unal. Ali and Cuma Goren were acquitted on both charges.

After the trial, Hanim Goren's bravery in testifying against her husband was praised by the police and her daughter Nuray, who stated: "No one should fail to realise what this means within our culture. These people do not forget". Following her testimony, the police installed extra security measures in Hanim's home.

== See also ==
- List of solved missing person cases

Honour killings in the United Kingdom

- Shafilea Ahmed
- Rania Alayed
- Banaz Mahmod
- Samaira Nazir
- Murder of Heshu Yones
- Rukhsana Naz

Honour killings of people with Kurdish ethnic heritage:

- Pela Atroshi (Iraqi Kurdistan)
- Fadime Şahindal (Sweden)
- Hatun Sürücü (Germany)
