= Murder of Heshu Yones =

2002 honour killing in London, England

Heshu Yones هێشو یۆنس
- Heshu Yones
- Born: 1986; Iraqi Kurdistan
- Died: 12 October 2002 (aged 16); Acton, London, England
- Cause of death: Murder by stabbing
- Citizenship: British
- Known for: Honour killing victim
- Parent(s): Abdalla and Tanya Yones

Heshu Yones (Sorani Kurdish: هێشو یۆنس; 1986 – 12 October 2002) was a 16-year-old Iraqi Kurd from Acton, London who was murdered by her father in an honour killing. Abdalla Yones killed his daughter for becoming too "westernised" and for engaging in a relationship against his orders. He was sentenced to life in prison in September 2003, with a minimum term of fourteen years.

Heshu's case was the first in the United Kingdom to be legally recognised and prosecuted as an honour killing; it led to the creation of a specialist task force in honour-based violence and, subsequently, to the reviewing of more than 100 previous cases of murder and suicide for any indication that "honour" was a factor.

== Background ==
Heshu was born into a Kurdish Muslim family in Iraqi Kurdistan circa 1986. She was the middle of three children born to Abdalla and Tanya Yones.

An Iraqi Kurd, Abdalla Yones was an active member of the Patriotic Union of Kurdistan (PUK), fighting for them from 1980 until 1991. Members of his extended family were killed under the tenure of Saddam Hussein and he himself was injured as a result of a chemical weapons attack, from which he suffered lasting consequences. He fled with his family to the United Kingdom during the first Gulf War, where they were granted asylum. While the family adjusted well to life in the United Kingdom, Yones struggled to adapt and was described as "a fish out of water".

Heshu attended William Morris Academy in Fulham, where she began a relationship with a fellow pupil. As her father expected her to live by their familial cultural and religious traditions, she led a double life; she would put make-up on only after leaving the house and she had her friends lie about her whereabouts so she could spend time with her boyfriend. She started truanting, her school grades suffered, she failed exams and ran up large bills on her mobile phone.

During the summer before Heshu's death, the Yones family returned to Iraqi Kurdistan for a holiday. Heshu was worried that her father would arrange a marriage for her, or prevent her from returning to the UK, she left a copy of her passport details with a friend and recorded a video diary while she was there. She later said that her father had forced her to undergo a virginity test which she allegedly failed, thus rendering herself unmarriageable within the Kurdish community; she said Abdalla held a gun to her head as a result. When the family returned to the UK, Heshu started making plans to run away from home.

On 10 October 2002, Heshu's father received an anonymous letter at the PUK office, where he worked in a voluntary capacity. The letter, written in Kurdish, claimed that the "community" was aware that Heshu had a boyfriend; it referred to her as a "slut" who behaved like a "prostitute".

=== Murder ===
On 12 October 2002, after months of confrontation and physical violence towards his daughter, Abdalla Yones smashed his way into the bathroom where Heshu had barricaded herself. He stabbed her multiple times and cut her throat, before cutting his own throat and throwing himself off a balcony.

=== Investigation ===
Abdalla Yones spent several months in hospital recovering from his self-inflicted injuries; throughout this time his wife and eldest son insisted that he was innocent of murder and tried to shield him from police questioning, claiming he was "mentally unstable". His son often visited him in hospital and it was during one such visit that they first told police that members of al-Qaeda were responsible for Heshu's murder.

They attempted to portray a harmonious family home life in the face of evidence to the contrary, such as the testimony of her friends, videos that Heshu had recorded, and a letter she had written to her father when planning to run away, in which she stated:

"Bye Dad, sorry I was so much trouble. Me and you will probably never understand each other, but I'm sorry I wasn't what you wanted, but there's some things you can't change.[...]Hey, for an older man you have a good strong punch and kick. I hope you enjoyed testing your strength on me, it was fun being on the receiving end. Well done."

— Heshu Yones

The police also noted that members of the Kurdish community tried to protect him and help him cover-up Heshu's murder. It was claimed that witnesses were threatened and the community tried to raise money for his bail which, in any case, was declined due to "credible information" a plan was in place to help him flee.

Metropolitan Police Commander, Andy Baker, later stated: "We are completely satisified [sic] that some members of the community, or (Yones) friends, tried to assist him in (the) cover-up. It's not about one person committing the murder, it's about the few that acknowledge it and support it and are involved in it".

After finally acknowledging that he had killed his daughter, Abdalla Yones tried to claim a defence of diminished responsibility, then provocation.

=== Guilty plea, sentencing and aftermath ===
Yones made a further suicide attempt while on remand, and days before his trial was due to start he changed his plea to guilty of murder. He said that the anonymous letter he had received at the PUK office was the key trigger for his actions; it left him "disgusted" and "distressed" and put him in an "untenable position"; his daughter's actions left a "stain" on his family's honour.

He was sentenced at the Old Bailey on 30 September 2003; he asked that the judge sentence him to death for what he had done.

In his sentencing remarks, Judge Denison referred to "a tragic story of irreconcilable cultural differences between traditional Kurdish values and the values of western society" and, when sentencing Yones to life in prison, noted "cultural differences" in mitigation when setting his minimum tariff of fourteen years.

Conversely, following the conviction, Metropolitan Police Commander Andy Baker stated: "Violence in the name of culture will not be tolerated. Murder in the name of honour will be punished by the severest penalties available in law."'

Baker set up a specialist unit and taskforce to investigate honour-related crime; along with conducting research and flagging up frontline training requirements, reviews were conducted on murder files from 1993 to 2003 in an effort to identify those which may have been motivated by "honour." By June 2004, at least 13 reviewed cases had been identified as such.

== See also ==
Honour killings in the United Kingdom:

- Shafilea Ahmed
- Rania Alayed
- Banaz Mahmod
- Samaira Nazir
- Tulay Goren
- Rukhsana Naz

Honour killings of people of Kurdish descent:

- Pela Atroshi (Iraqi Kurdistan)
- Fadime Şahindal (Sweden)
- Hatun Sürücü (Germany)
