= Artun (name) =

Artun is a masculine Armenian "Արթուն" or Turkish given name. In Turkish it means honorable, gentleman. In Armenian, it means awake. Notable people with the name include:

- Artun Akçakın (born 1993), Turkish footballer
- Artun Ertürk (born 1971), Turkish musician
