= Elisabeth Massi Fritz =

Swedish lawyer (born 1967)

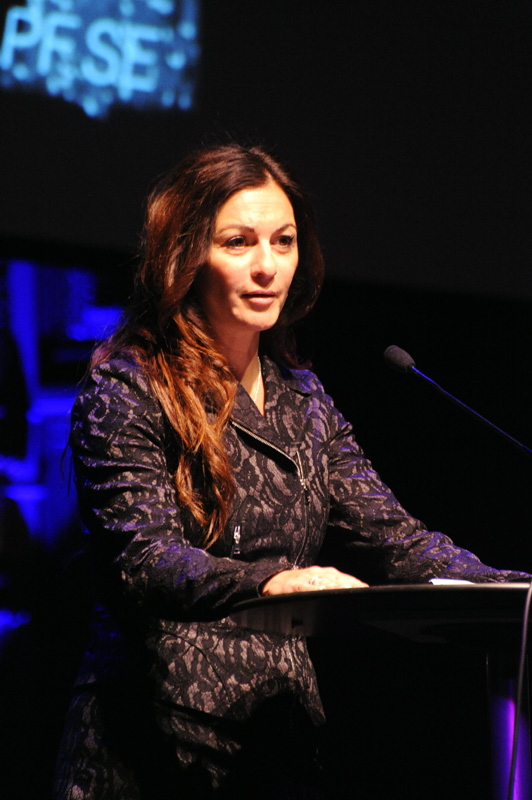
- Elisabeth Massi Fritz at Fadimedagarna 2014, Berns Salonger, Stockholm, Sweden.
- Born: Elisabeth Massi; 24 July 1967 (age 59); Växjö, Kronoberg County, Sweden
- Occupation: Lawyer
- Known for: Trial lawyer, women's rights advocacy
- Website: www.advokatfritz.com

Elisabeth Massi Fritz (born 24 July 1967) is a Swedish lawyer who has received recognition as counsel for an injured party for female victims of crime. She has received the Karin Söder commemoration award. She grew up in Motala in a family characterised as having a strong honor code. Massi Fritz is an advocate against honor culture and honor related crime.

== Career ==
In 1999 the Kurdish woman Pela Atroshi was killed by her father and her uncles because she had decided to not live by the strict norms of her family, one of the earliest widely publicised trials involving honor killings in Sweden. Massi Fritz was the counsel for the younger sister of Pela Atroshi.

In 2007, she was counsel for the victim in a noted case involving a plastic surgeon having raped his patient during surgery while she was sedated.

In 2015, she was noted for asking a rape suspect about his underwear during a trial, to demonstrate the absurdity of asking rape victims similar questions.

In 2017, she was counsel for several of the accusers in the metoo campaign.

In 2017 she was counsel for a gang rape victim who had been raped by two 19-year-old and one 20-year-old men. All received prison sentences and while the public prosecutor had demanded two of the men be deported to their home countries, the district court ruled not to deport them. The neglection to deport was appealed by Massi Fritz.

In 2017, she was counsel for the plaintiff in a case of gang rape involving about a dozen men of in the Stockholm suburb of Fittja, of which five stood trial. The accused were acquitted due to the poor handling of crime scene investigation by the Swedish Police Authority, this in turn led to a protest against the Police of Sweden where 80 000 signatures were collected.

In 2019, Elisabeth Massi Fritz was representing one of the alleged rape victims in an 9 year old preliminary investigation involving WikiLeaks' founder Julian Assange. While referring to the third prosecutor to take up the investigation (Eva-Marie Persson), Massi Fritz said: "She is going to be forced to take steps quickly to ensure that we have time to get a potential criminal charge in this case."

The 12 witness interviews (protocols)recorded in the 2010 police investigation including one with Assange were leaked to the Swedish press within days and remain on public record. Assange was vilified in the media for over nine years as Swedish prosecutors opened and closed the preliminary investigation without filing charges. The statute of limitation expired in 2020. No charges were laid.

In 2019, the USA State Department filed extradition proceedings relying on a Virginia based grand jury indictment.
