= Murder of Rania Alayed =

Honour killing of a Syrian woman in Greater Manchester, England

Rania Alayed
- Rania Alayed
- Born: 1988; Syria
- Died: 7 June 2013 (aged 24–25); Salford, Greater Manchester, England
- Resting place: Not known
- Occupation: Student
- Known for: Honour killing victim
- Spouse: Ahmed Al-Khatib
- Children: 3

Rania Alayed was a 25-year-old mother-of-three murdered by her husband in June 2013, in Salford, Greater Manchester, England. Greater Manchester Police (GMP) Chief Detective Inspector Bill Reade described this as an honour killing, and the prosecutors stated she was murdered for trying to achieve independence from her husband and undergoing "westernisation". Alayed's remains were found in February 2025.

== Background ==
Alayed was of Palestinian descent; she grew up in refugee camps in Syria where she met her husband Ahmed Al-Khatib, marrying him at age 15. Al-Khatib, who was a blacksmith by trade and nine years older than Alayed, was noted as being violent towards her from an early stage.

In February 2005, the couple moved to the United Kingdom, first settling in Norton, Teesside, before moving to Salford.

According to testimony at Manchester Crown Court, following the move to England Al-Khatib became increasingly jealous and controlling of Alayed and subjected her to years of domestic and sexual violence. In January 2013, she reported him to the police for domestic abuse, obtained a non-molestation order and moved into a homeless hostel, from where she and her children were subsequently rehoused in Cheetham Hill, March 2013.

After the separation she took English classes at Openshaw College, made new friends and "embraced" her new life; Al-Khatib resided with family in nearby Gorton.

The couple had three children, two boys and a girl, and had been separated for only a few months at the time of her death, at age 25.

== Crime and burial ==
On 7 June 2013, at the instigation of her estranged husband, Alayed went to her brother-in-law's home in Salford. According to Al-Khatib, she was to leave their children with him for the weekend and discuss plans for childcare.

Before Alayed's arrival, Al-Khatib's brother Muhanned had sent his partner and children away from the property and around 45 minutes after Alayed arrived was seen leaving the property himself, taking her children with him. Al-Khatib departed shortly thereafter, wearing some of Alayed's clothing in an attempt to give the impression that she had left the property alive. On his return, he put her body in a suitcase, which was then transported in Muhanned's motorhome, and moved to an unknown burial site.

After Al-Khatib had killed Alayed, he accessed her social media accounts and sent messages to her family pretending to be her and claiming to have moved to Turkey. Muhanned gave her mobile phone to an acquaintance who was travelling to Turkey and had them text her father from there to say that she was getting remarried.

Friends raised concerns about Alayed's welfare when she failed to attend a meeting on 8 June, and this information was passed from Cleveland Police to Greater Manchester Police on 9 June. However, it was not until 2 July, and following a phone call from her uncle in Lebanon, that she was officially treated as a missing person.

When questioned on 3 July 2013, Al-Khatib claimed that he had not seen Alayed for months and that he thought she was living in Turkey or Syria, but he was duly arrested on 4 July on suspicion of murder and, shortly thereafter, Muhanned contacted police and admitted that Alayed was dead. He claimed that her remains were buried near a layby along the A19 and Al-Khatib gave a similar version, stating that he had buried her near the A19 in Thirsk. The search for Alayed's remains encompassed a 19-mile stretch of the A19 and involved two police forces, teams from the Royal Engineers and RAF, along with specialist sniffer dogs, forensic botanists and archaeologists. The search was called off in September 2013, without success.

In February 2025 North Yorkshire Police searched and excavated a piece of land just off a lay-by on the A19 in Thirsk, and were almost certain they found Rania Alayed's remains. Formal identification is still outstanding as of November 2025.

== Trial and punishment ==
Ahmed Al-Khatib went on trial, alongside his brothers Hussain and Muhanned, at Manchester Crown Court in April 2014. He presented the partial defence of diminished responsibility, claiming that he was mentally ill and had killed Alayed in self-defence when she appeared to him in the form of an "evil apparition", or djinn. Throughout the trial, in an attempt to convince the jury that he was ill, he rocked back and forth, banged his head repeatedly against the dock and attacked both an interpreter and his brother.

His defence was rejected and he was found guilty of murder, with the Judge stating:

How you killed Rania may never be known but I think it's likely you strangled or smothered her, your actions after you murdered Rania showed no remorse – you thought she deserved to die.[...] Your ridiculous claim that when you killed Rania you were acting in self-defence after seeing her turn into a devil trying to strangle you was a further insult to her memory and the jury’s intelligence.

He received a life sentence with a minimum tariff of 20 years. In addition he pleaded guilty to "perverting the course of justice" for moving the body out of view of the authorities.

Muhanned Al-Khatib was acquitted of murder; he pleaded guilty to "intending to pervert the course of justice". His sentence was discounted to three years in jail because information he gave assisted in the successful prosecution of his brothers.

Hussain Al-Khatib was convicted of "intending to pervert the course of justice" and jailed for four years.

== Aftermath ==
Alayed's case was one of three in 2013 which came within the jurisdiction of Greater Manchester Police (GMP) and in which a known victim of domestic abuse was murdered by their partner. The Independent Police Complaints Commission (IPCC), which took more than four years to complete its investigation, found ‘very serious concerns’ and "recurring systems issues" in the way GMP handled domestic violence cases.

Various GMP staff investigated over their handling of Alayed's case were found to have displayed "poor" or "unsatisfactory" performance by the IPCC. None, however, were disciplined for misconduct by Greater Manchester Police.

== See also ==
Honour killings in the United Kingdom:

- Shafilea Ahmed
- Banaz Mahmod
- The murder of Surjit Athwal was planned in the UK and done in India
- Murder of Tulay Goren
- Heshu Yones
- Rukhsana Naz

Honour killings of people of Palestinian descent:

- Murder of Tina Isa

Honour killings of/involving people of other Arab descent:

- Murder of Noor Almaleki
- Yaser Abdel Said
- Ali Irsan

General

- List of solved missing person cases (post-2000)
- List of murder convictions without a body
