= Smart Materials and Structures =

- Discipline: Materials science
- Language: English
- Edited by: Alper Erturk

Publication details
- History: 1992-present
- Publisher: IOP Publishing (United Kingdom)
- Frequency: Monthly
- Impact factor: 3.8 (2025)

Standard abbreviations
- ISO 4: Smart Mater. Struct.

Indexing
- ISSN: 0964-1726 (print); 1361-665X (web)
- OCLC no.: 605076565

Links
- Journal homepage

Smart Materials and Structures is a monthly peer-reviewed scientific journal covering technical advances in smart materials, systems and structures; including intelligent systems, sensing and actuation, adaptive structures, and active control.

The initial editors-in-chief starting in 1992 were Vijay K. Varadan (Pennsylvania State University), Gareth J. Knowles (Grumman Corporation), and Richard O. Claus (Virginia Tech); in 2008 Ephrahim Garcia (Cornell University) took over as editor-in-chief until 2014. Christopher S. Lynch (University of California, Los Angeles) assumed the position of editor-in-chief in 2015 and was succeeded by Alper Erturk (Georgia Institute of Technology) in 2023, who serves as the current editor-in-chief.

== Abstracting and indexing ==
The journal is abstracted and indexed in:

- Aluminium Industry Abstracts
- Applied Mechanics Reviews
- Bioengineering Abstracts
- Chemical Abstracts
- Environmental Engineering Abstracts
- Engineering Index/Compendex
- Engineered Materials Abstracts
- Inspec
- Materials Science Citation Index
- Metals Abstracts
- PASCAL
- VINITI Database RAS

According to the Journal Citation Reports, the journal has a 2025 impact factor of 3.8.
