= Murder of Ahmet Yıldız =

Hate crime in Üsküdar, Istanbul, Turkey

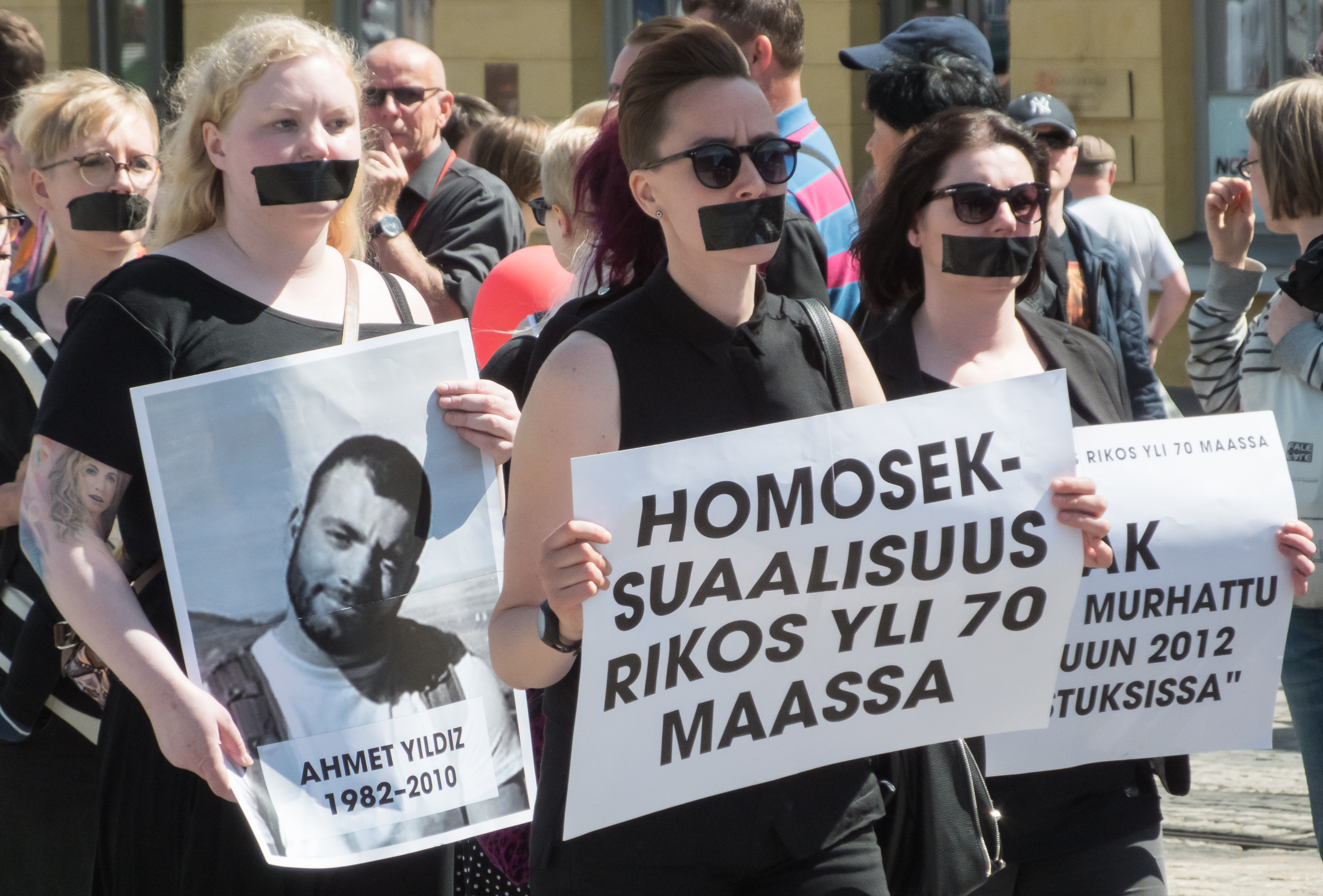
- A marcher with Marching for Those Who Can't holding up a sign in memory of Ahmet Yıldız in the 2015 Helsinki Pride
- Location: Üsküdar, Istanbul, Turkey
- Date: 15 July 2008; 18 years ago
- Attack type: Murder by shooting, hate crime, filicide, honor killing
- Deaths: Ahmet Yıldız, aged 26
- Injuries: Ümmühan Daraca
- Motive: Homophobia
- Accused: Yahya Yıldız
- Charges: Murder

The murder of Ahmet Yıldız occurred on 15 July 2008 in Üsküdar, Istanbul. The anti-LGBT hate crime was committed as an honour killing by his father Yahya Yıldız, in what has been widely referred to as the first known case of an anti-gay honour killing in Turkey. To date, Yahya Yıldız has become a fugitive and has yet to be captured and put on trial.

== Murder ==
Marmara University Physics Department student Ahmet Yıldız filed a criminal complaint with the prosecutor about a year before his murder that he had received threats from his family. On the night of 15 July 2008, Yıldız, who had gone to a cafe, faced an attacker following which he tried to get out of his car and escape. He was shot three times in the chest and eventually died from his injuries. Out of the five bullets that were shot, one injured the AK Parti's nominee for parliament Ümmühan Daraca. Commenting after the incident, Yıldız's cousin Ahmet Kaya said, "Yıldız was the only son of an extremely religious and wealthy Kurdish family in Şanlıurfa". Lambda Istanbul's human rights lawyer Fırat Söyle, who had previously served as a consultant to Yıldız, said that three months before the murder, Yıldız filed a complaint with the district attorney's office after receiving death threats from his family, but the prosecutor's office refused to initiate an investigation or provide protection to Yıldız. Yıldız's murder was given wide coverage in the local and foreign press. British newspaper The Independent also covered the issue and stated that cases of honour killing were not limited to Turkey.

== Investigation and trial ==
The trial for Ahmet Yıldız's murder began on 8 September 2009 and continued with the trial of Yahya Yıldız as a fugitive defendant. İbrahim Can, with whom Yıldız lived after he left his family, said about the incident: "I have seen the support of many organizations to fight for my lover. Ms. Ümmühan, who was injured in the incident, also helped us by opening the case. I thank her. It is surprising that the murderers of my darling Ahmet Yıldız have not been caught. Together we went to the prosecutor's office and reported that his family had been making death threats. I think we're experiencing gay discrimination. That wouldn't be the case if my lover was a woman. But that's my choice, and it's nobody's business." The case is postponed to a later date for the collection of evidence. After the 6th hearing, Can stated that he would start the ECtHR process, and stated: "Murderers are not coming out. An international arrest warrant has not yet been issued. I want this warrant issued at the next hearing. The court should abandon its homophobic attitude. This has now become a political cause. The court does not show the will, determination and effort to arrest the [victim's] father. In a homophobic country, it will not be desirable for them to clarify this case."

== Zenne Dancer ==
The film Zenne Dancer, based on a story inspired by the murder of Ahmet Yıldız and directed by Ahmet Yıldız's friends Caner Alper and Mehmet Binay, was released on 13 January 2011.

== See also ==
Honour killings of people of Kurdish origin

- Fadime Şahindal (Sweden)
- Hatun Sürücü (Germany)
