= Honor-related violence in Sweden =

Honor-related violence in Sweden (Swedish: Hedersförtryck i Sverige or Hedersrelaterat våld i Sverige) first received public attention in Sweden due to the honor killings of Sara Abed Ali in 1996, Pela Atroshi in 1999 and Fadime Sahindal in 2002. Honor related violence includes forced marriage, female genital mutilation, and other forms of coercion. According to the Swedish Agency for Youth and Civil Society in 2009, about 70 thousand women and men reported pressure to marry against their will. In 2019, the Swedish Police Authority started to specifically track honor-related crimes, and by November 2021, 4500 suspected honor-related crimes had been reported.

Honor related violence exists in every culture, but is more common in cultures emanating from North Africa via the Middle East to Central Asia and the Indian subcontinent. Honor crimes are distinguished from domestic violence by four main factors: prior planning, multiple perpetrators acting in concert, pride in the act, and sympathy for the victim.

== Definition ==
Honor-related violence (HRV) can take the form of restrictions exercised by families, extended families or larger collectives from honor cultures in order to protect them from perceived injuries to their reputation. Violating the restrictions may lead to direct physical abuse such as assault, honor killing or psychological abuse such as restrictions on activities in the private life or being constantly controlled and monitored by relatives. These controls aims towards controlling the sexuality of girls as the reputation of a family is dependent upon the actual or alleged behavior of its female members.

Life in a family from an honor culture means putting the will of the collective before the will of the individual, for example regarding the choice of partner, divorce, work outside the home or getting an education. The honor culture concepts regarding female sexuality are also involved in child marriages, forced marriages and female genital mutilation. Besides being expected to monitor their sisters and other female relatives, boys and young men can also subjected to threats and limitations in their life choices such as forced marriages.

HRV first received public attention due to the honor killings of Sara Abed Ali in 1996, Pela Atroshi in 1999 and Fadime Sahindal in 2002. According to the Swedish Agency for Youth and Civil Society in 2009, about 70 thousand women and men reported they risked being forced to marry against their will. This represented 6.6% of females and 3.8% of males aged 16–25 in Sweden.

== Origins ==
Honor cultures exist worldwide but are more common among people originating in regions spanning from North Africa via the Middle East to Central Asia and the Indian subcontinent. Honor culture norms are also prevalent among Romani people in Sweden. According to researchers, those who live according to honor culture norms are primarily those who have immigrated to Sweden.

In honor cultures, the family unit is the basic unit of society unlike societies based on individuals. Honor cultures are characterised by weak institutions and individualistic societies by strong state institutions. Sweden is one of the most individualist societies worldwide viewed from a traditionalist or secular perspective which is enabled by a strong welfare state. Lacking strong government institutions, society is frequently structured along clans or bloodlines, for example as in Afghanistan, Albania, Eritrea, Iraq, Kurdistan, Libya, Palestine, Pakistan and Somalia. In these societies, clans and extended families perform the roles assumed by the welfare state.

== Characteristics ==
In honor culture families, men are the primary decision makers but honor-related violence is also exercised by women. The family is organised according to a hierarchy where men have higher status than women and the older family members are ranked above the younger. According to the Government of Sweden in 2020, young women and girls are the primary targets of HRV besides young men and HBTQ individuals.

== Honor-related crimes ==
The most serious honor-related crime is often organized, deliberate and not limited to murders (honor killings). Incidents include torture, forced suicides, forced marriages, rapes, kidnapping, assault, mortal threats, extortion and protecting a criminal.

In September 2019, the Swedish Police Authority started to specifically track honor-related crimes. By November 2021, 4500 suspected honor-related crimes had been reported and registered.

=== Comparison with domestic violence ===
According to the Swedish Prosecution Authority, domestic violence differs from honor-based violence in the following ways:

Trait	Honor related violence (HRV)	Domestic violence
Individual/Collective	HRV is collectively planned and executed	Single perpetrator
Approval	In HRV, family members and fellow clan members frequently express great sympathy with the perpetrators.	The crime is condemned by close relatives of the perpetrator who receives little or no loyalty.
Planning	HRV is frequently planned in advance and sanctioned by relatives of the perpetrator	Not planned in advance
Regrets	The perpetrator often displays pride and may receive approval and respect from the group.	Perpetrator expresses regret and changes behaviour after exercising violence.

== Marriages ==
In Sweden like in other countries, forced marriages and child marriages often involve spouses who live in different countries.

Forced marriages primarily target children and young adults which leads to that many child marriages are also forced.

=== Forced marriage ===
According to a 2012 government survey, at least 250-300 individuals reported a high risk of being forced into marriage against their will and at least 16 individuals were kept abroad to be married against their will.

In July 2014, authorities saw it necessary to criminalize forced marriages to protect individuals who were forced to marry against their will (Swedish: äktenskapstvång). The maximum sentence is 4 years. No court has given the maximum sentence as of January 2019.

The legislation also criminalized forcing someone to marry abroad where underage marriages are legal and also covered misleading someone to travel abroad under false pretenses where the intended outcome was to have the target individual married (Swedish: vilseledande till tvångsäktenskapsresa).

=== Child marriage ===
Marriages before the age of 18 are banned in Sweden and are not recognized if either spouse had citizenship or residency in Sweden.

According to a 2012 government survey, in a single year the Swedish Tax Agency handled 70 registrations of child marriages abroad where one spouse had either residency or citizenship in Sweden.

== Female genital mutilation ==
In 1982, Sweden was the first western country in the world to explicitly prohibit genital mutilation. It is punishable by up to six years in prison, and in 1999 the Government extended the law to include procedures performed abroad. General child protection laws could also be used. The prevalence of FGM among immigrant groups in Sweden is unknown, but by 2011 there had been 46 cases of suspected genital mutilation since the law was introduced in 1982, and two convictions, according to a report published that year by the National Centre for Knowledge on Men's Violence against Women.

The National Board of Health and Welfare has estimated that up to 38,000 women living in Sweden may have been the victims of FGM. This calculation is based on UNICEF estimates on prevalence rates in Africa, and refer to FGM carried out before arriving in Sweden. The Ministry of Health and Social Affairs launched an action plan against FGM in 2003, which included giving courses to African women and men, who are now working as health advisors and influencing the public opinion among their fellow countrymen. In 2014, a Somali-born national coordinator at the County Administrative Board of Östergötland said the problem is not actively being pursued by authorities and the issue is avoided for fear of being perceived as racist or as stigmatising minority ethnic groups.
