= Murder of Pela Atroshi =

Honor killing of a Kurdish woman in Duhok

Pela Atroshi
- Pela Atroshi
- Born: 12 October 1979; Duhok, Kurdistan Region
- Died: 24 June 1999 (aged 19); Duhok, Kurdistan Region
- Cause of death: Murder by firearm
- Citizenship: Swedish, formerly Kurdish
- Known for: Honor killing victim

Pela Atroshi (12 October 1979 – 24 June 1999) was a 19-year-old Kurdish woman from Farsta, Sweden. She was murdered in an honor killing by family members after being taken from Sweden to Duhok. She was deemed to have brought shame on the family by moving out of the family home and trying to achieve some independence.

Two of Pela's uncles, Dakhaz Atroshi and Rezkar Atroshi, were convicted of her murder in Sweden and were sentenced to life in prison, later commuted to 24 and 25 years respectively. Pela's father, Agid Atroshi, was tried in Iraq and was given a suspended sentence as the court concluded that his motive was "honorable".

== Background ==
Pela was the oldest of seven children. Pela and her family moved to Sweden from Duhok in Kurdistan Region in 1995. The family settled in Farsta where she and her younger sister, Breen Atroshi, attended school. Described as "sociable and popular", Pela initially thrived at school and achieved good grades, and both she and her sister embraced their new lives.

Their father, Agid Atroshi, fearing that they might do something to undermine the family reputation, introduced stringent rules in an effort to stop them from "living the European way". The girls were not permitted to go to cafés or shops, as their peers did, and their father timed them to make sure they came straight home from school.

Pela started to challenge her father's rules, wanting to make her own decisions about where she went and what she wore, but this just resulted in stricter rules being imposed; he stopped the girls from going to parties and banned them from going on school trips. The quarrels between Pela and her father escalated to the point that she moved out of the family home. An unmarried female staying away from home was frowned upon by the family — Breen Atroshi claimed that her uncle Dakhaz told her that sleeping away from home for just one night would deserve death.

After Pela moved out her grandfather and uncle travelled to Sweden from Australia and along with her other paternal uncles, Dakhaz and Rezkar Atroshi, visited the family to discuss with her father how they should handle Pela's behaviour.

The UN Special Rapporteur on Violence Against Women, Yakin Ertürk, reported that she was told that a "family council of male relatives living in Sweden and Australia decided that Pela had to die to cleanse the family honour".

Pela eventually returned home of her own accord as she missed her family. A plan was already in place, however, to take her back to Dohuk, where the family were well respected and honor crimes were treated leniently.

== Murder ==
In June 1999, shortly after Pela returned home, the family traveled to Duhok in Kurdistan together with her paternal uncles, Shivan, Rezkar and Dakhaz Atroshi. Agid Atroshi later claimed that the purpose of the visit to Kurdistan was to arrange a suitable marriage for Pela. Conflict and quarrels followed and Pela was accused of not living according to Kurdish values. On 24 June 1999, Pela was shot twice in her back in an upstairs room of the family home. The shooting was carried out by Rezkar Atroshi. Pela's sister Breen testified that she and her mother had tried to go to Pela's aid, but that her uncles, and father, had physically separated them while Rezkar shot Pela through the head.

Pela was buried in an unmarked grave in Duhok. Relatives from the Pela's mother's side of the family marked the site with a plain stone, despite opposition from Pela's father.

== Legal proceedings ==
=== Duhok ===
In October 1999, Agid and Rezkar Atroshi stood trial for Pela's murder in Iraq. Agid claimed that he killed Pela and that he did it because her attempts to follow western traditions disgraced the family, and also claimed that she had lost her virginity. When sentencing the two men, the judge noted that the "motive for the killing was honourable" as it was carried out to "cleanse the family of dishonour"; they received a twelve-month conditional (suspended) sentence.

After Pela's murder, Breen contacted Swedish authorities from Kurdistan and told them what she had witnessed, naming all three of her uncles as being involved in the murder, including two who had since returned to Sweden.

=== Sweden ===
After receiving a suspended sentence for murdering Pela, Rezkar Atroshi returned to Sweden, along with his brother Dakhaz. As the murder was planned in Sweden and both the perpetrators and the victim were Swedish citizens, the authorities decided to pursue the brothers in a Swedish court.

The then Minister for Foreign Affairs, Anna Lindh, took an interest in the case and silent diplomacy enabled the authorities to bring sister Breen Atroshi back from Kurdistan.

Rezkar and Dakhaz Atroshi stood trial in December 2000. Breen Atroshi was a witness for the prosecution with lawyer Elisabeth Massi Fritz as counsel for the witness. The court found that the father and the uncles had planned and carried out the murder together. Rezkar and Dakhaz were found guilty on 12 January 2001 and sentenced to life in prison. Svea Court of Appeal confirmed the sentence in June 2001. The case was the first honor killing trial in Sweden.

The sentences of uncles Rezkar and Dakhaz were commuted to limited durations of 24 and 25 years in prison and they were released after having served two-thirds of the time in 2016.

== Aftermath ==
Breen lives under a new identity in Sweden, having been threatened for giving evidence against her uncles.

Pela's mother divorced Agid Atroshi and returned to Sweden with three of their children. She also lives under a protected identity. Agid remained in Kurdistan after Pela's murder, and as of 2009 was still wanted in Sweden.

In 2000, an Interpol investigation looked into the whereabouts of Pela's grandfather who, as the patriarch, was alleged to have instigated the murder; it was believed that he was in hiding somewhere in Kurdistan.

In Sweden, Pela's death led to the introduction of specialist shelters for girls at risk of honour-based violence, as well as telephone hotlines and awareness programs delivered via schools, health services and the immigration sector.

== See also ==
- Honor-related violence in Sweden
- Honor killing of Fadime Şahindal
- Hatun Sürücü (Germany)
- Murder of Tulay Goren (United Kingdom)
- Murder of Heshu Yones (United Kingdom)
- Banaz Mahmod (United Kingdom)
