= Lanja Khawe =

Kurdish lawyer and human rights activist

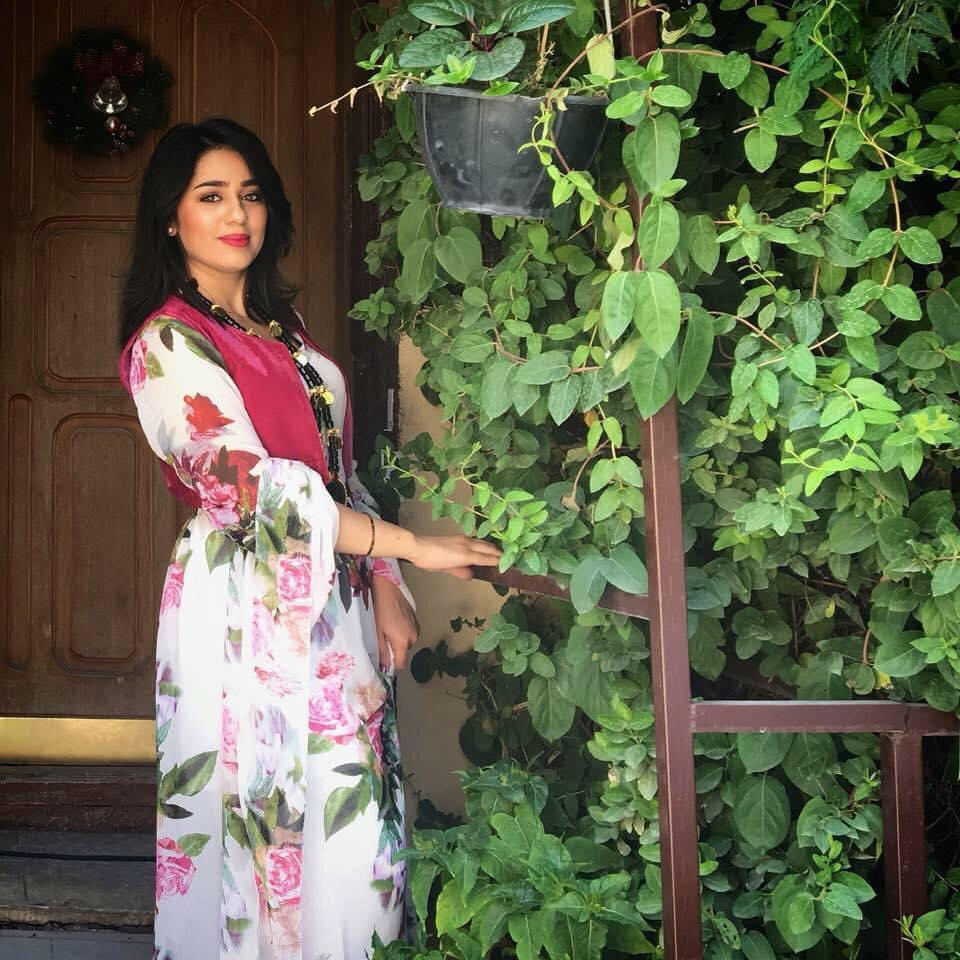
- Born: January 1993 (age 33); Sulaymaniah
- Occupations: Lawyer, writer, activist

Lanja Khawe (born 1993) is a Kurdish lawyer, writer and feminist. She is the founder of the Sofia Association and the social media campaign #KurdistanWomenPower, also founder of Pana community to prevent and reduce suffering of homelessness without any gender based discrimination.

== Biography ==
Khawe was born in January 1993 in Sulaymaniah, South Kurdistan within the political borders of Iraq. A lawyer and human rights activist, Khawe has worked with Kurdish women who are survivors of sex trafficking and domestic violence. She founded the Sofia Association in 2016 to provide a book delivery service by bicycle for women and girls who are unable to buy them. According to Khawe, the project encourages literacy and access to knowledge, so that women can understand the rights they have more fully. It is not just the supply of books that is a feminist act for the organisation - even using bicycles as transport makes a feminist statement, since women riding them is still seen as shameful. Since its beginnings in Sulaymaniah, the project has spread to other cities, including Erbil, Kirkuk and Halabja.

In 2017 Khawe founded the social media campaign #KurdishWomenPower which encouraged women to share photos of themselves on social media, challenging the idea that photographs online of women are inherently shameful. In 2019 Khawe and the Sofia Association organised a conference on sexual violence in Sulaymaniah, which was attended by Deputy Prime Minister Qubad Talabani. She is a contributor to the anthology, Kurdish Women's Stories, edited by Houzan Mahmoud.
