= Houzan Mahmoud =

Kurdish feminist and writer

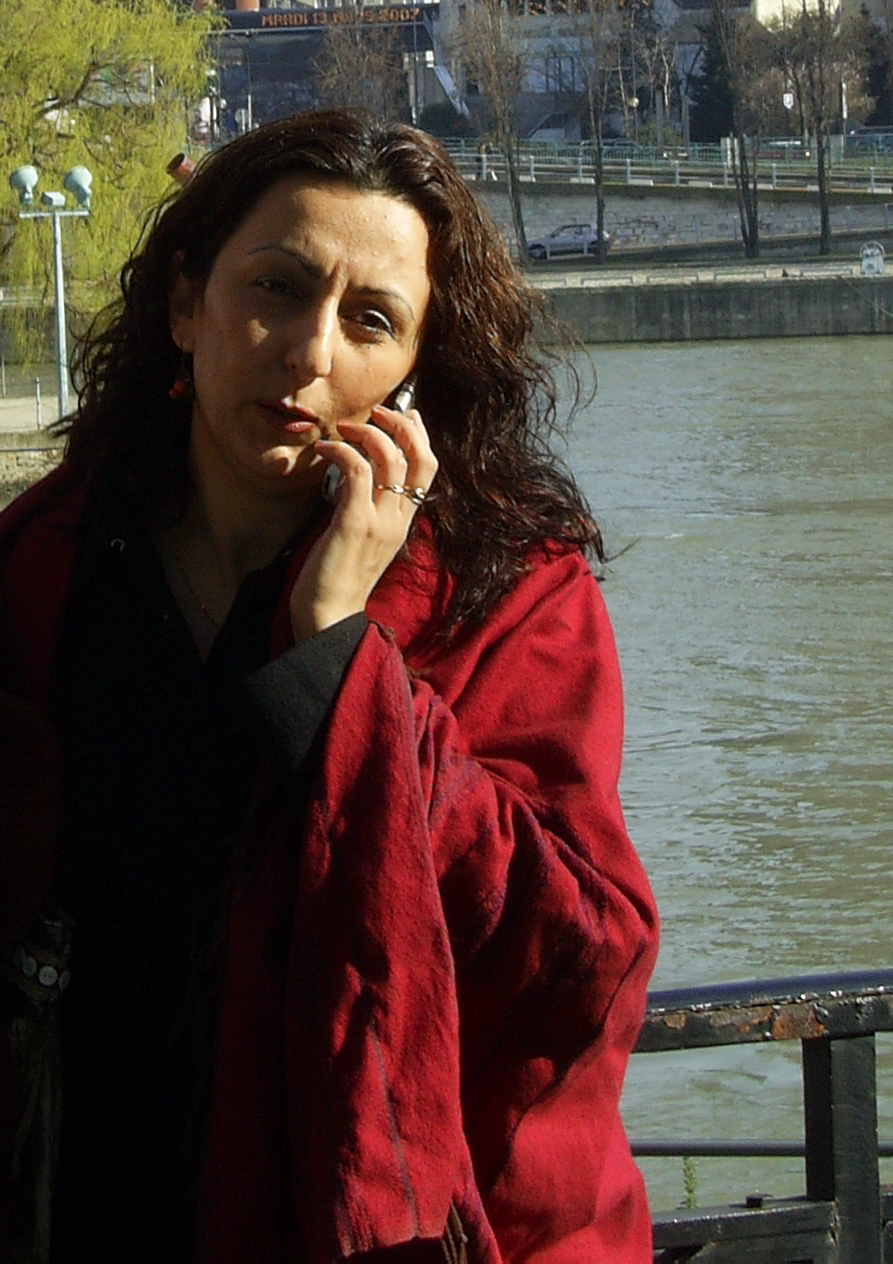
- Houzan Mahmoud in Paris
- Born: Kurdistan

Houzan Mahmoud (born 1973) is a Kurdish feminist, writer and anti-war activist born in South Kurdistan. She was one of the speakers at the anti-war rally in March 2003 in London and is the co-founder of the Culture Project, a platform for Kurdish feminists, writers and activists.

== Biography ==
Mahmoud grew up under the regime of Iraqi dictator Saddam Hussein, and her earliest memories were of the Iran-Iraq war of 1980–88. "From the day I was born, all the way to this moment, all I have witnessed is war, a never ending war in Iraq", she has said. She started reading feminist literature, which inspired her activism against patriarchal violence, in particular honour killings, female genital mutilation, and forced marriages.

Mahmoud received an MA in Gender Studies from SOAS. She has also worked as a representative of the Organisation of Women's Freedom in Iraq.

Mahmoud has led many international campaigns in defence of women's rights among them campaigns against Sharia law in Iraq and Kurdistan.. Her articles have been published in The Guardian and The Independent. She is the editor of Kurdish Women's Stories, an anthology of women's autobiographical writings from across the regions of Kurdistan. The accounts took two years to gather, though the work of Culture Project and features women from the ages of twenty to seventy, including activist Lanja Khawe.

== Publications ==
- Mahmoud, Houzan (8 March 2004). "An empty sort of freedom". The Guardian.
- Mahmoud, Houzan (14 August 2005). "Iraq must reject a constitution that enslaves women". Independent.
- Mahmoud, Houzan (13 June 2006). "A symptom of Iraq's tragedy". The Guardian.
- Mahmoud, Houzan (27 September 2006). "A dark anniversary". The Guardian.
