= Zara Mohammadi =

Kurdish cultural activist (born 1990)

- زارا محەممەدی
- Born: 1990 (age 35–36); Dehgolan, Iranian Kurdistan, Iran
- Occupations: Cultural activist, Kurdish language teacher

Zara Mohammadi or Zahra Mohammadi (Kurdish:زارا محەممەدی; born 1990 in Dehgolan) is a Kurdish activist and language teacher. The BBC has named her as one of the 100 Inspiring and influential women of 2022. She was sentenced to five years in Sanandaj Women's Prison for teaching people her mother tongue. The Revolutionary Court of Sanandaj accused Zara of undermining Iran's national security by forming groups and committee which threatens national security. She is also a member of the board of directors of Nozhin Cultural and Social Council.

Even though she was sentenced for five years in prison, on 10th February 2023, Zara got freedom without her plea for amnesty. After her freedom, she published a video on her Instagram account and said “Neither I nor my lawyer signed any plea for amnesty, and I never will do so!”.
