= Alper Erturk =

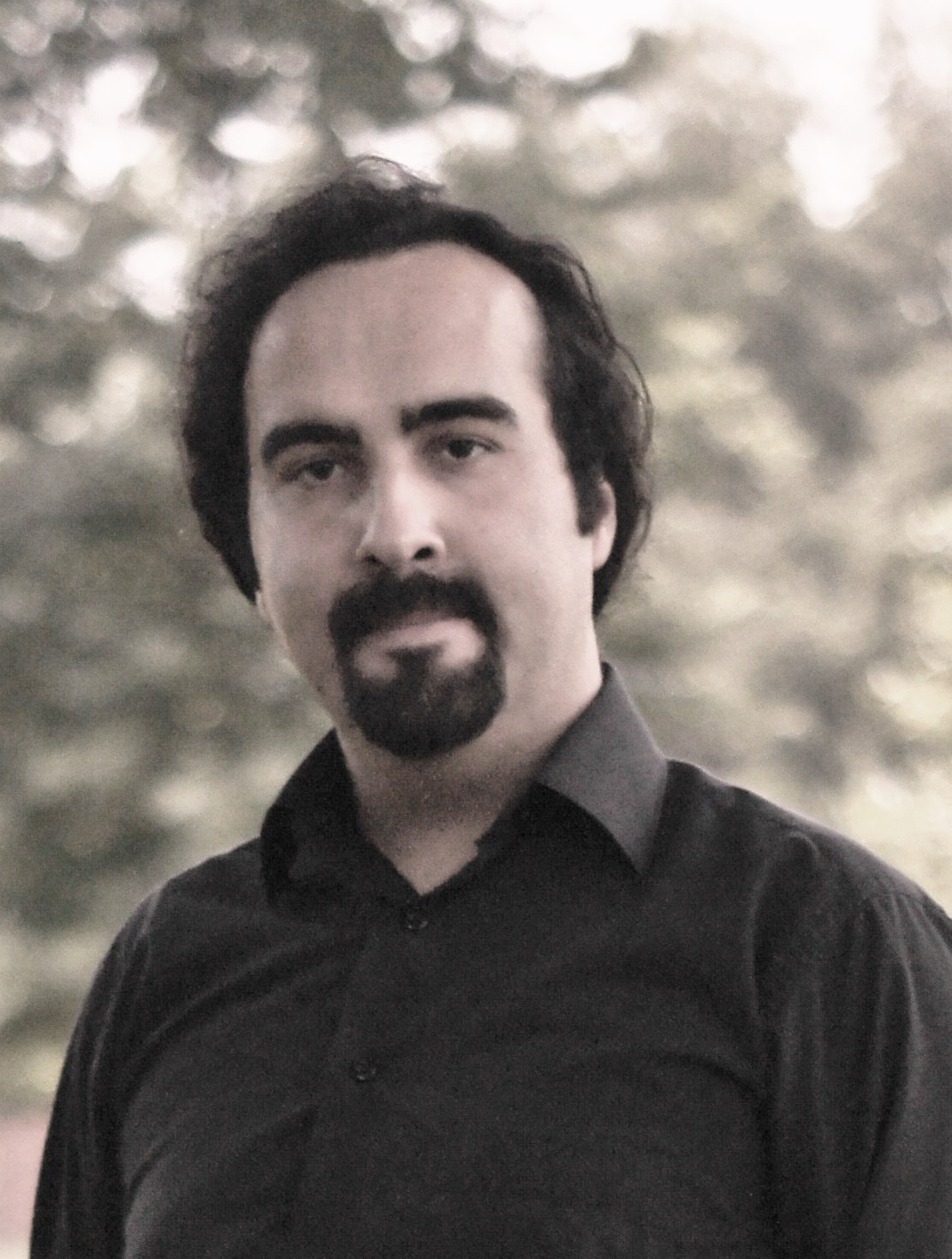
- Born: April 3, 1982 (age 44)
- Education: Virginia Polytechnic Institute and State University, METU
- Scientific career
- Fields: Mechanical engineering; Engineering mechanics
- Workplaces: Georgia Institute of Technology, George W. Woodruff School of Mechanical Engineering

Alper Erturk (born April 3, 1982) is a mechanical engineer and the Woodruff Professor in the George W. Woodruff School of Mechanical Engineering at Georgia Institute of Technology.

== Research ==
Erturk leads the Smart Structures and Dynamical Systems Laboratory at Georgia Tech. His publications are mostly in the areas of dynamics, vibration, and wave propagation involving smart materials and metamaterials. Erturk made fundamental contributions in the field of energy harvesting from dynamical systems. His distributed-parameter piezoelectric energy harvester models have been widely used by many research groups. He was one of the first researchers to explore nonlinear dynamic phenomena for frequency bandwidth enhancement in energy harvesting, specifically by using a bistable Duffing oscillator with electromechanical coupling, namely the piezomagnetoelastic energy harvester. His early energy harvesting work also included the use of aeroelastic flutter to enable scalable airflow energy harvesting through piezoaeroelastic systems. His collaborative work on flexoelectricity established a framework to exploit strain gradient-induced polarization in elastic dielectrics for enhanced electricity generation at the nanoscale.

Erturk's group also contributed to smart material-based bio-inspired aquatic locomotion by developing the first untethered piezoelectric swimmer and explored fluid-structure interaction via underwater actuation of piezoelectric cantilevers. Their recent efforts resulted in multifunctional piezoelectric concepts for bio-inspired swimming and energy harvesting.

Another research topic explored by his group is wireless power and data transfer using ultrasound waves. More recently, Erturk and collaborators investigated the leveraging of guided waves in cranial and transcranial ultrasound.

Erturk and collaborators also explored metamaterials and phononic crystals for elastic and acoustic wave phenomena. They developed and experimentally tested some of the first 2D elastic wave and 3D bulk acoustic wave lenses, locally resonant metamaterial-based structural theories and experiments, including programmable piezoelectric metamaterials and metastructures.

== Awards ==
- Elected Fellow of SPIE (2020)
- SEM James W. Dally Young Investigator Award (2020)
- Elected Fellow of ASME (2017)
- ASME C.D. Mote Jr. Early Career Award (2017)
- TASSA Young Scholar Award - Junior Faculty Level (2016)
- ASME Gary Anderson Early Achievement Award (2015)
- ASME Energy Harvesting Best Paper Award (2015, 2017)
- National Science Foundation CAREER Award (2013)
- Liviu Librescu Memorial Scholarship (2008)
- METU Parlar Foundation Thesis of the Year Award (2006)
