= Artun Ertürk =

Artun Ertürk (born 13 May 1971 in Ankara, Turkey) is a Turkish musician, composer, lyricist and producer, best known as the founder of the Turkish band Diplomatik Rock Opera (DRO) and the songwriter of famous Turkish singer Pamela Spence's many songs including national hits "İstanbul" and "Ayrılamayız Biz".

== Life and career ==
Artun Ertürk started to play the guitar when he was eleven years old. His first guitar was a Bulgarian-made acoustic one, which was a present from his elder brother, who also taught him his first chords. Then, he continued learning how to play it by himself, playing by the ear. Although professional-wise there are no musicians in Ertürk's family, his grandfather, mother and brother as well as his aunt were very musical people, playing instruments and singing songs.

Ertürk then learned how to play the classical and the jazz guitars, the latter initially inspired by hearing famous French guitarist and bassist Biréli Lagrène, who came to prominence in the 1980s for his Django Reinhardt-influenced style on the classical guitar, as well as for being a jazz fusion virtuoso on the electric guitar. Ertürk started playing the electric guitar in 1986 for the first time, after one of his friends who immigrated to England gave his guitar to him as a present.

His first band, in which he was one of the vocals and guitar players, was named "Absent Without Leave", whose members changed within years. In 1995, a new band formed under the name "Diplomatic Immunity", where Ertürk was playing the guitar once again, working with several important musicians of Turkey.

Ertürk started to record his first solo album in English with Ahmet Tekneci, Emrehan Halıcı, Barış Menküer and Murat Köselioğlu in 2001; however, before the mixing process started, he got together with his old friend Pamela Spence and they made three high- profiled albums titled “Eğer Dinlersen” (If You'll Listen), “Şehir Rehberi” (City Guide) and “Cehennet” (a made-up word in Turkish suggesting that a place contains both heaven and hell). “Şehir Rehberi” (City Guide), which includes the famous hit “İstanbul”, was actually composed as the solo album of Artun Ertürk, but with the suggestion of the recording company, it was changed into the album of Pamela Spence just before the recording process started. Artun Ertürk and his band Diplomatic Immunity went on the tours of the mentioned albums and they played as the live group of Pamela Spence. Towards the end of 2004, Pamela Spence got to number one on lists and stayed there for succeeding weeks. Ertürk's "İstanbul" was chosen for MTV's "World Chart Express" and stayed on the list for four consecutive weeks as the number one hit song.(Artun Ertürk & DRO Facebook page))

In 2007, Ertürk's band got its final name, "Diplomatik Rock Opera", also known as DRO, the members including Alp Dündar (vocals), Koray Işıldak (bass), Barış Menküer (drums), Murat Köselioğlu (keyboards) and Artun Ertürk himself (electric guitar). Their song titled “Cinsellik Açık Bir Kapı” (Sexuality is an Open Door), in which Pamela Spence took part (Pamela Spence/Info), became a hit on the lists.

In 2011, Ertürk composed all the songs in the second album of DRO in English and the band completed the recordings of the album, which is to be released in the US in the beginning of 2012, in (Feedback Studios)in Ankara. He has also recently penned and produced the solo album of Cemil Demirbakan, the ex-singer of famous Turkish band Yüksek Sadakat.
