= Yakin Ertürk =

Turkish politician and professor

Yakin Ertürk (born 1945) is a Turkish former United Nations special rapporteur on violence against women and board member of the United Nations Research Institute for Social Development (UNRISD), and was a professor of sociology.

== Early life and education ==
Ertürk has a B.A. from Hacettepe University (1969) and a Ph.D. in sociology from Cornell University, her thesis (1980) was on "Rural change in Southeastern Anatolia : An Analysis of Rural Poverty and Power Structure as a Reflection of Center-Periphery Relations in Turkey".

== Career ==
Ertürk held posts at King Saud University (1979–1982), Hacettepe University (1983–1986) and Middle East Technical University (METU) (1986–1987) before joining the United Nations in 1997 to become Director of the International Research and Training Institute for the Advancement of Women (INSTRAW) in Santo Domingo, Dominican Republic (1997–1999) and then Director of The Division for the Advancement of Women at UN headquarters in New York (1999–2001). She rejoined the faculty of METU in 2002, and was a professor in the Department of Sociology until her retirement, and was also the chair of the university's Gender and Women's Study Programme. She was a Visiting Global Associate, Rutgers University, the Center for Women's Global Leadership (CWGL) and the Institute for Women's Leadership (IWL) Consortium (15 Sept. 2017-15 April 2018).

In 2003, she was appointed as the United Nations special rapporteur on violence against women, and held this position for six years. 2009–2013, she served on the Council of Europe Committee on the Prevention of Torture.

== Selected publications ==
- Towards an effective implementation of international norms to end violence against women: Report of the Special Rapporteur on violence against women, its causes and consequences, Yakin Ertürk (PDF). United Nations: Economic and Social Council. 2003.
- Intersections of violence against women and HIV/AIDS: Report of the Special Rapporteur on violence against women, its causes and consequences, Yakin Ertürk (PDF). United Nations: Economic and Social Council. 2005.
- The due diligence standard as a tool for the elimination of violence against women: Report of the Special Rapporteur on violence against women, its causes and consequences, Yakin Ertürk (PDF). United Nations: Economic and Social Council. 2006.
- Intersections between culture and violence against women: Report of the Special Rapporteur on violence against women, its causes and consequences, Yakin Ertürk (PDF). United Nations: Economic and Social Council. 2007.
- Indicators on violence against women and State response : Report of the Special Rapporteur on violence against women, its causes and consequences, Yakin Ertürk (PDF). United Nations: Economic and Social Council. 2008.
- Political economy of women's human rights: Report of the Special Rapporteur on violence against women, its causes and consequences, Yakin Ertürk (PDF). United Nations: Economic and Social Council. 2009.
- Erturk, Yakin; Thompson, Audrey. 15 years of the United Nations Special Rapporteur on violence against women, its causes and consequences (1994-2009) a critical review (PDF).
- Ertürk, Yakin (2016). Violence without Borders : Paradigm, policy and praxis concerning violence against women. Women's Learning Partnership. ISBN 978-1939525666.
- Afkami, M.; Ertürk, Y.; Mayer, A.E., eds. (2018). Feminist Advocacy, Family Law and Violence Against Women. Routledge. doi:10.4324/9780429438202-2. ISBN 978-0-429-43820-2. S2CID 158530374.

- Ertürk, Yakın (2018). "Feminist advocacy for family law reform: international perspectives". In Afkami, M.; Ertürk, Y.; Mayer, A.E. (eds.). Feminist Advocacy, Family Law and Violence Against Women. Routledge. pp. 11–29. doi:10.4324/9780429438202-2. ISBN 978-0-429-43820-2. S2CID 158530374.
