= Murder of Rukhsana Naz =

1998 honour killing in England

Rukhsana Naz
- Born: 13 April 1978
- Disappeared: 26 March 1998
- Died: 26 March 1998 (aged 19); Derby, England
- Cause of death: Murder by ligature strangulation
- Body discovered: 31 March 1998, Denby Dale, West Yorkshire
- Known for: Honour killing victim

Rukhsana Naz (Urdu: رخسانہ ناز; 13 April 1978 – 26 March 1998) was a 19-year-old British Pakistani woman and mother-of-two from Normanton, Derby, who was murdered by her brother with the help of her mother in an honour killing.

Rukhsana was taken to Pakistan at age 15 and forced to marry her cousin. Back in Derby, she embarked on an affair with her "childhood sweetheart" and fell pregnant. Her family tried coercing her into terminating her pregnancy and remaining in her forced marriage; when she refused they killed her.

Rukhsana's mother and two brothers went on trial at Nottingham Crown Court in May 1999. Shakeela Naz and the elder brother, Shazad Naz, were found guilty of murder and sentenced to life in prison.

Rukhsana's case helped bring the issue of forced marriage to the fore in the UK. Shortly after the convictions Home Office minister Mike O'Brien launched an enquiry, setting up the Working Group on Forced Marriage which, in turn, led to the creation of the Forced Marriage Unit.

== Background ==
Rukhsana had a long-standing relationship with a fellow pupil from her school days, Imran Najib; the Naz family considered him to be "socially inferior" and both families opposed the match.

In spring 1994, Rukhsana was taken to Pakistan under the guise of visiting her grandfather but while there was forced into an arranged marriage with her second cousin, Sajid Nawaz. Sajid remained in Pakistan pending a visa application, while a now pregnant Rukhsana returned to Derby. She made one further visit to Pakistan in 1996, which led to the birth of a second child, but essentially they lived apart throughout the entire marriage.

Back in Derby, Rukhsana engaged in an affair with Imran who, by this stage, was also married; in late 1997 she fell pregnant with his child. She moved out of the family home, sharing a house with her sister Safina and brother-in-law, and hoped to have her baby, divorce Sajid and live with Imran.

When Shakeela Naz discovered that her daughter was expecting a child from an adulterous relationship she tried to force her into terminating her pregnancy, but Rukhsana refused. Shakeela kicked her daughter in the stomach and urged her to take a large quantity of paracetamol to try to bring about a miscarriage.

It was customary for the Naz family to get together for a family meal every week but, on 26 March 1998, Rukhsana called to say that she was unwell and wouldn't be attending. Her sister Safina claimed that Shakeela had dissuaded Rukhsana from attending due to concerns about other family members discovering her daughter's pregnancy, which had now started to show. Safina further stated that, at around 7:00 p.m., Shakeela suddenly claimed that she needed to visit someone in the hospital; she left the house with her two sons, returning alone just over an hour later.

Safina and her husband returned to their home at around 10:30 p.m. and, finding that Rukhsana wasn't there, phoned Shakeela, who told her not to worry and to "go to sleep"; Safina reported Rukhsana as missing, but withdrew the report after Iftikhar said it would "bring shame on the family".

== Murder ==
Shakeela Naz had approached her doctor about arranging an abortion for Rukhsana; she was advised that the pregnancy was too advanced, but it was suggested that a doctor in Birmingham may be able to help. Shakeela summoned her eldest son, Shazad, from London and together they planned to issue Rukhsana with an ultimatum. Leaving the family meal, under the pretence of a hospital visit, they and Iftikhar made their way to Safina's home.

Each of the three defendants gave differing accounts of exactly what transpired, but ultimately Rukhsana was strangled to death with a plastic flex and her body dumped some miles away in a field in Denby Dale, West Yorkshire. Her remains were found on 31 March 1998, less than 2 weeks from her 20th birthday.

=== Iftikhar Naz ===
Iftikhar Naz initially claimed to have been at the home of his girlfriend, Louise, during the timeframe that Rukhsana went missing; Louise duly provided him with an alibi. Maintaining he knew nothing about his sister's whereabouts, he noted that she'd been threatened by Imran Najib's father. He also told Louise that he feared she'd been kidnapped. Days later, Louise withdrew her support for the false alibi and alleged that Iftikhar had told her that he, his mother and brother had killed Rukhsana. When informed of Louise's admission he changed his account of events, now claiming it was a premeditated plan constructed by his mother and brother of which he knew nothing in advance. He professed to have been in the bathroom when Rukhsana was first attacked; when he returned to the room he saw his brother with a cord around Rukhsana's neck and his mother holding her legs down. He asserted that he'd been threatened into helping dispose of her body.

=== Shakeela Naz ===
Shakeela initially claimed to have left the family meal on 26 March to visit a friend and not to have seen or spoken to Rukhsana; like Iftikhar, she also pushed the alleged threats made towards her daughter by Imran Najib's father. She acknowledged she had been angry with Rukhsana, and that on a prior occasion had kicked her and spoken to her about having an abortion. On discovering that Iftikhar had placed her at Rukhsana's home at the time of her death she changed her account of events, now claiming that Shazad had attacked his sister and that she'd tried to prevent it. She admitted helping to wrap the body in a covering but maintained the decision to dispose of the body was that of her sons.

=== Shazad Naz ===
Shazad left the country shortly after the murder, returning on 24 June. He admitted going to Safina's house with his mother and brother on the evening of 26 March; he claimed to know nothing about her pregnancy prior to that. He stated that Rukhsana had "lashed out" at her mother during an argument, that he'd tried to intervene and somehow managed to get a flex lead tangled around her neck while attempting to restrain her. He claimed Shakeela had tried to revive Rukhsana but that she was already dead.

He later admitted he'd held the flex around Rukhsana's neck for 3–4 minutes. He submitted a plea of provocation, claiming the "sudden and temporary loss of self-control" was triggered by the level of shame he felt over his sister's actions and this was due to his ‘idealistic’ religious beliefs.

== Legal proceedings ==
Shakeela, Shazad and Iftikhar Naz stood trial at Nottingham Crown Court in May 1999, the trial lasted for two and a half weeks. The key prosecution witnesses were Rukhsana's sister Safina, and Louise, the girlfriend of Iftikhar Naz.

Shazad Naz's partial defence of provocation, on the basis of religious and cultural beliefs, was rejected and he and Shakeela Naz were convicted of murder and sentenced to life imprisonment on 25 May 1999. Iftikhar Naz was acquitted.

In his sentencing remarks, Mr Justice Tucker stated:

It was a particularly horrific offence, involving as it did the death of a young pregnant woman, who was already a mother of two children, at the hands of her own family [...] In my view this was a planned murder.

Shakeela Naz appealed against her conviction, which was dismissed on 23 March 2000.

In 2007 Shakeela also appealed against the minimum term set for her life sentence, which was also rejected and it was reaffirmed that she would serve a minimum term of 14 years. When handing down his judgement, Mr Justice Grigson noted that the trial judge had recommended a minimum term of 17 years and that this had already been reduced by the Lord Chief Justice "expressly on the basis that her cultural background mitigated the criminality of her act".

He further stated:

This Applicant played a significant role in the murder of her own pregnant daughter. She still denies that role. I can see no reason to reduce the minimum term of 14 years save by the time she spent in custody on remand.

== See also ==
- Forced Marriage (Civil Protection) Act 2007
- List of solved missing person cases
- Honour killings in the United Kingdom
