= Murder of Hatun Sürücü =

2005 murder in Berlin, Germany

Hatun "Aynur" Sürücü (17 January 1982 – 7 February 2005) was a Kurdish woman living in Germany whose family was originally from Erzurum, Turkey. She was murdered at the age of 23 in Berlin, in an honour killing by her youngest brother. Sürücü had divorced the cousin she was forced to marry at the age of 16, and was reportedly dating a German man. Her murder inflamed a public debate over forced marriage in Muslim families.

Sürücü was sent to Istanbul by her family and forced to marry a cousin there at the age of 16. She gave birth to a son, Can, in 1999. In October 1999, she fled her parents' home in Berlin, finding refuge in a home for underage mothers. She attended school, and had moved into her own apartment in the Tempelhof neighbourhood of Berlin. At the time of her murder, she was at the end of her training to become an electrician.

== Background ==
Hatun Sürücü was born in 1982, to Kerem, a gardener's assistant from the village of Uzunark in Erzurum Province, Turkey, and Hanım, from the nearby village of Marifet.

== Murder ==
On 7 February 2005, at a bus stop near her apartment, Sürücü was killed by three gunshots to the head. The police arrested three of her brothers on 14 February. After several weeks of news coverage, the media began to label the murder as an honour killing, since Sürücü had received threats and reported them to police before she was killed.

== Prosecution ==
In July 2005, the Berlin Public Prosecutor's office charged Sürücü's brothers with her murder. On 14 September 2005, Ayhan Sürücü, the youngest brother, confessed to murdering his sister. In April 2006, Ayhan was sentenced to nine years and three months in prison, and his two older brothers were acquitted of charges of conspiring to murder their sister. The prosecution appealed on a point of law at the Federal Court of Justice, the Bundesgerichtshof, immediately and the 5th criminal division of the Federal Court of Justice overturned the conviction and allowed a revision. A new criminal proceeding was to take place in August 2008.

After completing his sentence on 4 July 2014, Ayhan Sürücü was released from prison and deported from Germany to Turkey.

== Public outrage ==
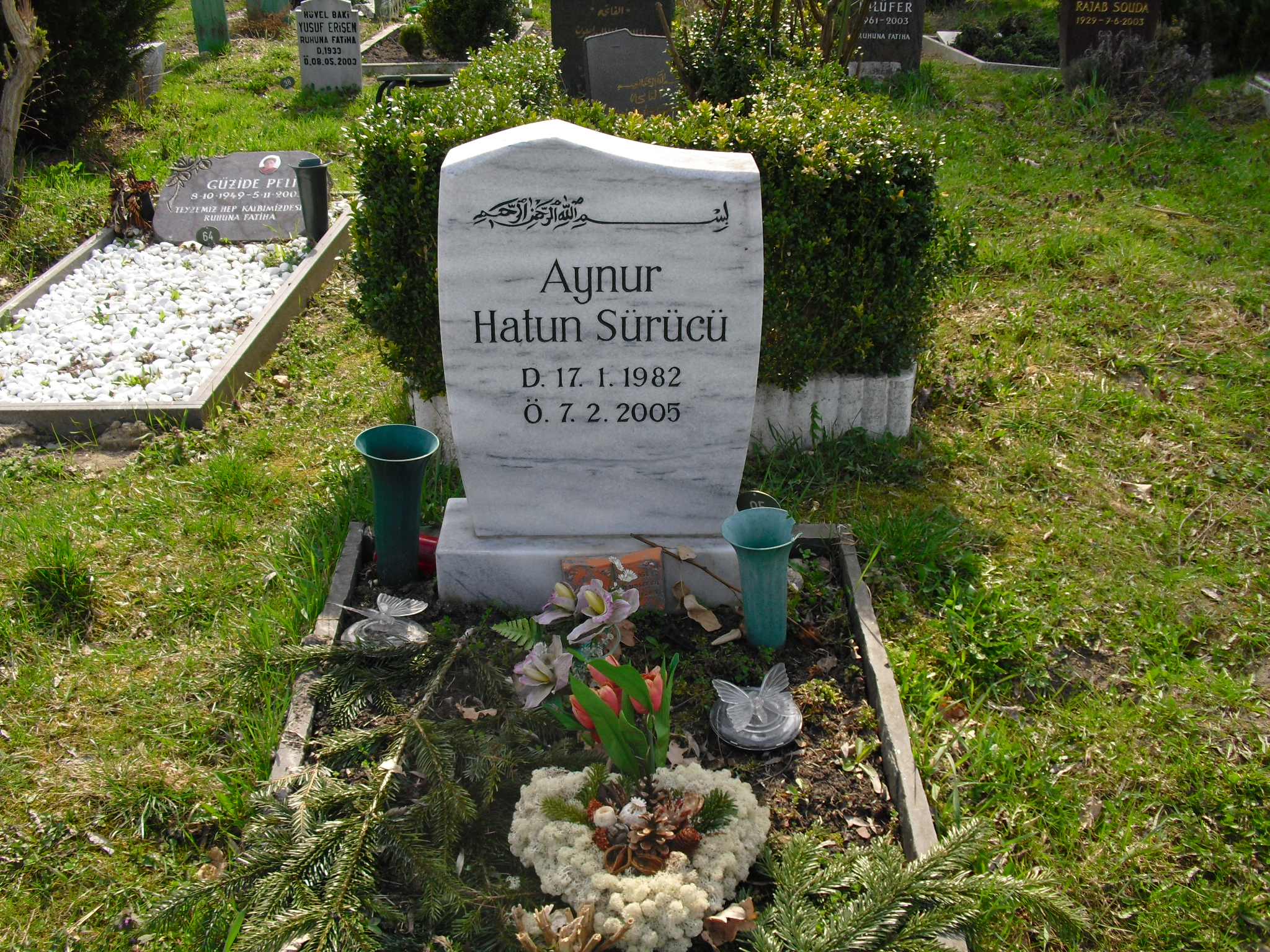
Hatun Sürücü's grave in Berlin-Gatow

Sürücü's murder was the sixth incident of "honour" killing since October 2004. On 22 February 2005, a vigil called by the Berlin Gay and Lesbian association was held at the scene of the crime, which was attended by about 100 Germans and Turks together. A second vigil, called for by German politicians and artists, was held on 24 February. Sürücü's murder and several similar cases in Germany and elsewhere in Europe were cited by political opponents of Turkey's admission to the European Union as an example of disregard for human rights in the Turkish culture. Sürücü was of Kurdish descent.

The Sürücü family's behaviour again sparked public outrage when Hatun's sister Arzu applied for custody of Hatun's six-year-old son Can, who had been living with a foster family in Berlin since the murder of his mother. Eight months later, the district court of Berlin-Tempelhof rejected the request. Arzu Sürücü appealed this decision, and the appeal was also rejected.

The public continues to demonstrate for Hatun on the anniversary of her death. Activists and citizens lay wreaths in her memory and campaign for help for girls who are faced with forced marriage and honour-related violence. Giyasettin Sayan, a Kurdish politician, complained that no Kurdish representatives were invited to demonstrations after Sürücü's murder, saying, "we are all from Turkey, but we are not all Turks."

== Legacy ==
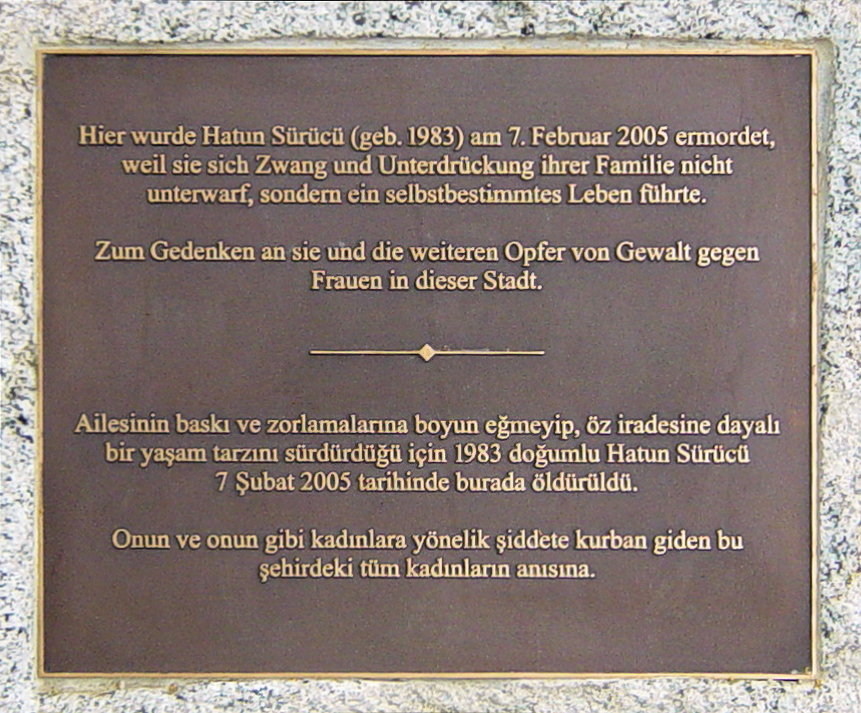
Memorial plaque for Hatun Sürücü, Oberlandgarten 1, Berlin-Tempelhof, Germany (corner Oberlandstraße (Berlin) / Oberlandgarten). The plaque mentioned incorrect year of birth (1983 instead of 1982). It was replaced in 2013.

- A bridge in Neukölln, Berlin was named after the victim.
- Die Fremde (When We Leave) was the first film released in 2010 inspired by the events.
- A Regular Woman, a film made about the crime, was released in 2019.

== See also ==
- Murder of Morsal Obeidi
- Murder of Pela Atroshi
- Murder of Ahmet Yıldız
- Murder of Banaz Mahmod
- Murder of Fadime Şahindal
