= Murder of Fadime Şahindal =

Honour killing of a Kurdish woman in Sweden

Fadime Şahindal
- Born: 2 April 1975; Elbistan, Kahramanmaraş Province, Turkey
- Died: 21 January 2002 (aged 26); Uppsala, Sweden
- Cause of death: Murder by shooting
- Body discovered: Her father's home
- Other name: Fadime Şahindal
- Known for: Mid Sweden University

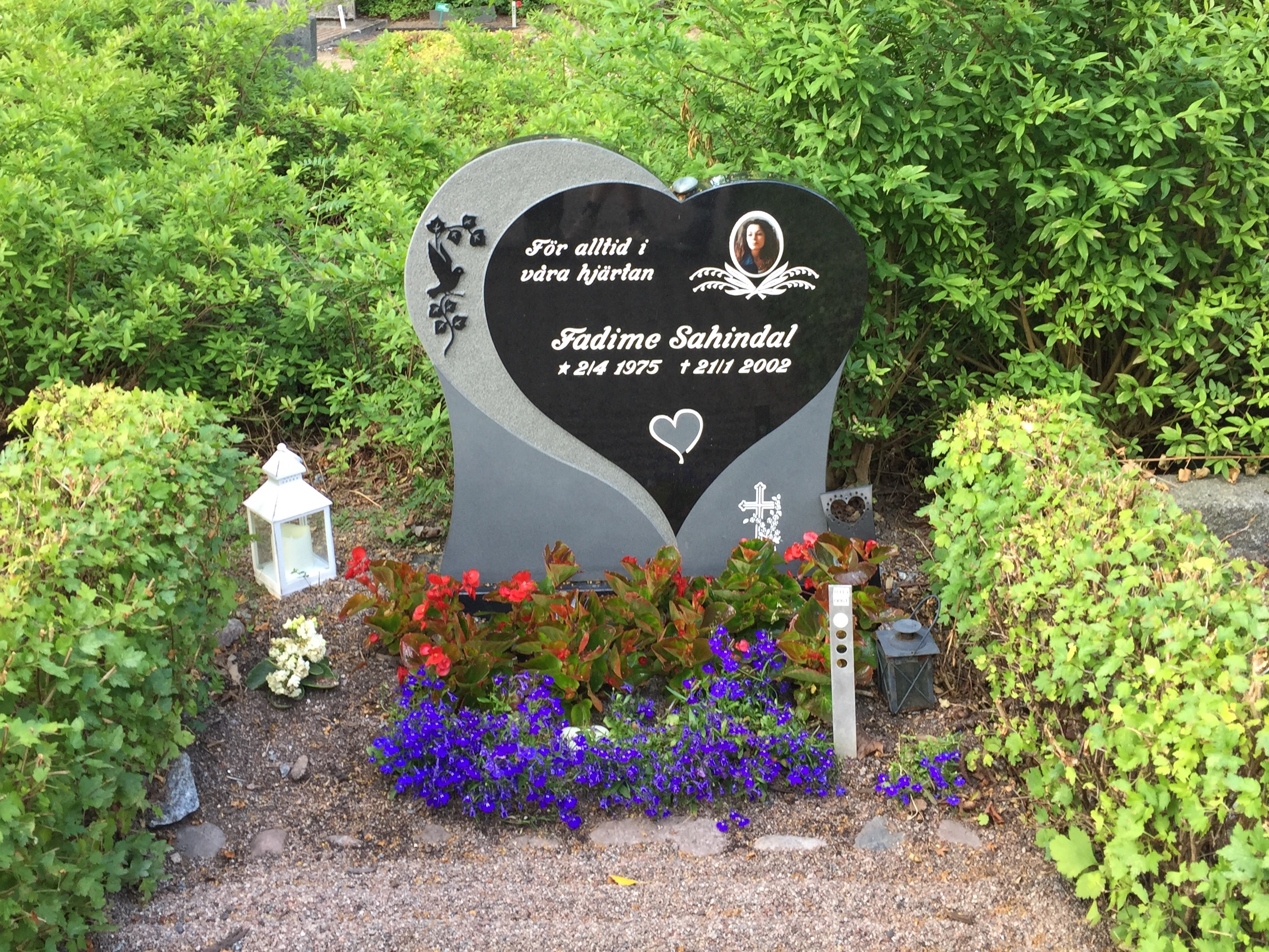
Sahindal's grave

Fadime Şahindal (2 April 1975, in Elbistan – 21 January 2002, in Uppsala) was a Kurdish immigrant who moved to Sweden from Turkey at the age of seven. She was murdered by her father, Rahmi, in January 2002 in an honour killing.

== Life ==
Fadime Şahindal was born in 1975 in the southeastern, Kurdish part of Turkey, in a small village outside the city of Elbistan. She described her family as happy people who worked together with agriculture and animal husbandry, where everyone knew their role and task. However, Fadime Şahindal and her younger sister Songül also stated that they were beaten as children.

When Fadime Şahindal was seven years old, she, her mother, brother and five sisters moved to Sweden. Her father had migrated to Sweden a few years earlier, in 1981, before the family followed. Fadime Şahindal's life in Sweden began in the Nyby district of Uppsala. Later, she attended Gränbyskolan elementary school in Uppsala.

Fadime Şahindal was a talented pupil but her parents hid from her the university acceptance letter. She only found out by chance that she had been accepted for a course in social studies at Mid Sweden University.

She was opposed to her family's insistence on arranging her marriage to a male cousin who lived in their Kurdish native village in Turkey. Instead she opted to pursue a relationship with a Swedish man. At first she kept the relationship secret, but her father found out about it. Şahindal then left her family and moved to Sundsvall, where her brother found her and threatened her. She went to the police, who advised her at first to talk to her family. She then turned to the media with her story, after which she turned again to the police and was offered a protected identity. By turning to the media, Şahindal managed to receive support from the Swedish authorities. She filed a lawsuit against her father and brother, accusing them of unlawful threats, and won.

Şahindal was scheduled to move in with her boyfriend, Patrick, the following month, in June 1998, when he died in a car accident. He was buried in Uppsala. Her father forbade her to visit Uppsala, since he did not want her to visit her boyfriend's grave. Nalin Pekgul, a Kurdish-Swedish parliamentarian, negotiated a compromise in which Şahindal agreed to stay away from Uppsala and her father promised not to stalk her.

On 20 November 2001, the Violence Against Women network arranged a seminar on the topic "Integration on whose terms?" During the seminar, Şahindal spoke in front of the Riksdag about her personal story.

== Murder ==
On 21 January 2002, Şahindal to stop in Uppsala on the way to Stockholm, where she would go to arrange plans for a trip to Kenya. Missing her mother and sisters, she arranged to secretly meet them at her sister's apartment, which Rahmi soon discovered. The family watched television during the afternoon, and at 7:15 their mother entered the apartment. They hugged each other, locked the door and then waited for the youngest sister to come home. Later, the doorbell rang, and they thought it was the youngest sister who came; however, the caller was the father, who they could see through the door's peephole. They didn't answer the door when he rang, but the father waited for her outside. However, it became quiet in the stairwell after half an hour.

Later, when Fadime Şahindal was about to leave the apartment to go to her friend's house and sleep over, she opened the door and met her father. He pointed a gun at her, grabbed her hair and shot her twice in the head in front of her mother and two sisters. One shot hit her in the forehead and the other in the jaw. At 9:54 pm, Şahindal's sister Songül called an SOS Alarm. The autopsy showed that Şahindal was killed by the first shot.

== Investigation and trial ==
Confronted by police, Rahmi Şahindal confessed and said in his defence that he was ill. Despite the confession, one of her cousins later tried to convince the police that he had killed her. During the trial, her father said that another man killed Şahindal, but claimed that he could not reveal the killer's identity under threat of death.

Her father was ultimately convicted of murder by a Swedish court and sentenced to life imprisonment. He was released in 2018 after 16 years in prison. The murder shocked Sweden, with many highlighting in the subsequent social debate that the murder could have been prevented if the many preexisting reports on honour culture had been taken more seriously. On 4 February, Fadime Şahindal was buried in Uppsala Cathedral. The officiant was deacon Tuulikki Koivunen Bylund. Crown Princess Victoria, a number of ministers and thousands of visitors came to the commemoration. Her murder also sparked debates in Sweden about immigrant integration and raised questions regarding Patrick's death.

== See also ==
- Honor-related violence in Sweden
- Pela Atroshi
- Banaz Mahmod
- Hatun Sürücü
- Murder of Ahmet Yıldız
