= Connor Finch =

English television actor

- Education: Guildhall School of Music and Drama
- Occupation: Actor
- Years active: 2021–present
- Television: Bookish

Connor Finch (born 3 January 1996) is an English television actor. His television roles include Everything I Know About Love (2022) and as Jack on mystery drama Bookish (2025–present).

== Early life ==
From Clacton-on-Sea in Essex, Finch had an interest in acting from a young age. He attended the Colchester Institute but also took part in classes at the Dance Foundation in Clacton, and at Arts Ed in London. He attended the Guildhall School of Music and Drama.

== Career ==
Finch had early television roles in the ITV series The Larkins and Professor T, and the Dolly Alderton series Everything I Know About Love for BBC One, portraying a musician living it up in East London in the 2010s.

He portrayed Jack, a former convict given a second chance in post-war Britain, in the 2025 U&Alibi crime drama series Bookish alongside writer Mark Gatiss, and Polly Walker. That year, he was confirmed to be returning for the second series, which was broadcast in August 2026.

== Filmography ==
Year	Title	Role	Notes
2021	The Larkins	Kenny	1 episode
2022	Everything I Know About Love	Street	3 episodes
2022	Professor T	Joss Jones	
2025–present	Bookish	Jack	Main role
