= Good Material =

2023 novel by Dolly Alderton

- First edition cover (UK)
- Author: Dolly Alderton
- Cover artist: Yiting Nan; Emma Ewbank
- Language: English
- Genre: Romance; Comedy
- Published: 2023
- Publisher: Fig Tree
- Publication place: United Kingdom
- Media type: Print
- Pages: 336
- ISBN: 9780241993163
- Dewey Decimal: 823/.92
- LC Class: PR6101.L4425 G66 2024
- Preceded by: Ghosts

Good Material is a 2023 romantic comedy novel by British author Dolly Alderton. The novel follows Andy, a 35-year-old struggling comedian whose girlfriend of almost four years, Jen, unexpectedly ends their relationship. The story explores Andy's attempts to cope with the breakup while navigating dating and friendships in his thirties.

== Plot ==
Andy Dawson, a 35-year-old struggling comedian in London, navigates the aftermath of his unexpected breakup with his girlfriend of nearly four years, Jennifer Bennett. After Jen ends their relationship with little explanation, Andy becomes fixated on understanding her reasons. He engages in heavy drinking and monitors Jen's social media accounts.

Andy moves out of their shared apartment, first staying with his mother and then with his best friend Avi and Avi's wife Jane, who is also Jen's best friend. He later rents a room from Morris, an eccentric older man. Andy attempts to gather information about Jen while struggling with feelings of loneliness and personal failure. He avoids openly discussing his pain with his friends.

Andy briefly lives on a houseboat and hires a personal trainer. He discovers that Jen has started dating someone new and begins tracking her new boyfriend's online presence. His comedy career also begins to suffer after a negative review criticising his lack of effort and originality goes viral. He begins a brief relationship with a 23-year-old woman named Sophie, but ends it upon realising that her feelings for him are stronger than his for her.

Andy and Jen reconnect at the birthday party of Avi and Jane's son and spend the night together. The following morning, Andy realises that their relationship is definitively over. He begins to revise his comedy routine, incorporating the breakup into his material. The new act is well received by audiences and earns positive feedback from Jen.

In the novel's final pages, the narrative shifts to Jen's perspective. She explains that the relationship was challenging because of Andy's emotional struggles and lack of ambition, and that she believes being single is the best decision for her personal growth. The book concludes with Jen planning a year-long tour of South America in 2020, while Andy prepares to perform his new show at the Edinburgh Festival Fringe that summer.

== Themes ==
A central theme in the novel is heartbreak and the coping mechanisms that follow. The novel uses relationship maxims such as "The Flip", describing the shift in power during a breakup, and the "90/10 rule", which posits that people seek rebound partners who possess the 10% of qualities missing in their previous partners. Dolly Alderton also addresses male friendships and the challenges men face in expressing their emotions, including how social expectations affect the ways men communicate and seek support from friends during difficult times.

== Style ==
Most of Good Material is narrated in the first person by Andy. In the final section of the novel, the narrative shifts to Jen's point of view.

== Background ==
Dolly Alderton started writing Good Material in 2020 following a breakup. To research the male experience of heartbreak and relationships, Alderton interviewed around 15 men. Sam Franzini of Shondaland reported that the men often felt they lacked the language or permission to discuss their emotions in detail with male friends: "They told her that when they spoke to their friends about their break-ups, 'they felt they were boring them. Some of them said they could talk for a while but eventually they would worry they weren't being entertaining enough or that their dignity was compromised.'"

Alderton said she chose to write from a male perspective to challenge herself as a fiction writer and to create a character distinct from herself, contrasting with her previous novel, Ghosts.

Franzini compared Good Material with Alderton's 2018 memoir, Everything I Know About Love, writing that "Good Material reads like the precursor to Everything I Know About Love. Before the wisdom, before the lessons, before the growth – Andy is the target demographic for the life advice Alderton offered up in her 2018 memoir."

== Reception ==
Writing for The New York Times, Katie Baker described the novel as "deliver[ing] the most delightful aspects of classic romantic comedy — snappy dialogue, realistic relationship dynamics, humorous meet-cutes and misunderstandings — and leav[ing] behind the clichéd gender roles and traditional marriage plot." Hephzibah Anderson of The Observer wrote that Alderton "entertains with observational quips about thirtysomething life" and noted the "distinctly Hornbyesque charm to her well-meaning characters and their relatable dramas." Michael Donkor, writing for The Guardian, described the novel's "bouncy and very British comic sensibility" and wrote that "the overriding impression it leaves is one of a writer comfortably settling into her groove, and very much in control of her material." Kirkus Reviews described the novel as "an easy read for those with a soft spot for the hopelessly doomed romantic", while also writing that "save for a couple of quips about Boris Johnson and the wealth disparity between Andy and Jen, the novel lacks any meaningful social commentary."

Daisy Lester of The Independent gave the novel five out of five stars, calling it "a cliché-avoiding break-up novel" and praising its "whipsmart dialogue and relatable millennial themes." Clare Mulroy of USA Today awarded the novel 3.5 out of 4 stars, writing that "Alderton's writing shines its brightest in the last 60 pages of the book when she uses a surprising and sharp juxtaposition to put the story to bed. Her ability to create complex characters and tell the story with a varied perspective is masterful, giving Andy (and us as readers) the closure that's needed from this heartbreak." Anna Bonet of the i praised the novel, stating that "if only more books were as funny as this" and that "Alderton's take on the breakup novel showcases her knack for rich characterisation and zippy dialogue like never before."

Multiple reviewers drew comparisons between Good Material and Nick Hornby's novel High Fidelity due to their shared premise of a man dissecting a past relationship. Franzini discussed the novel's treatment of power dynamics in age-gap relationships, unrequited love, and the experience of feeling eclipsed by a younger generation in one's mid-thirties.
