= Honour (British TV series) =

British television series

- L-R: DCI Goode, Banaz, Bekhal, Rahmat
- Genre: True crime drama
- Written by: Gwyneth Hughes
- Directed by: Richard Laxton
- Starring: Keeley Hawes; Rhianne Barreto; Alexa Davies; Moe Bar-El; Michael Jibson
- Composer: Matthew Herbert
- Country of origin: United Kingdom
- Original language: English
- No. of series: 1
- No. of episodes: 2

Production
- Executive producers: Peter Kosminsky; Liza Marshall; Gwyneth Hughes; Keeley Hawes
- Producer: Alliea Nazar
- Running time: 60 minutes
- Production companies: Hera Pictures; Buddy Club Productions

Original release
- Network: ITV
- Release: 28 September – 29 September 2020

Honour is a two-part British television drama series, depicting the investigation into the real-life disappearance and murder of honour killing victim Banaz Mahmod.

Gwyneth Hughes created the screenplay using the first-hand experiences of key figures from the real case including Bekhal Mahmod, Nawzad Gelly and Caroline Goode, who acted as consultant. Nazir Afzal, CPS assistant Chief Crown Prosecutor when Banaz's case was brought to trial, was the production's legal consultant.

Starring Keeley Hawes as DCI Caroline Goode the drama was commissioned by ITV, directed by Richard Laxton and produced by Hera Pictures in association with Buddy Club Productions. It first aired on ITV on 28 and 29 September 2020.

== Plot ==
Rahmat Suleimani reports his 20-year-old girlfriend, Banaz Mahmod, as a missing person; newly promoted DCI, Caroline Goode, heads Team 16 of the London Metropolitan Police Homicide and Serious Crime Command in the ensuing search.

While Banaz's parents insist Banaz is not missing, her phone hasn't been used and there have been no transactions in her bank account. It soon transpires that Banaz had been in contact with the police repeatedly in the preceding months; she had even left a note with her local police station listing several men, including her uncle Ari Mahmod, who she claimed were planning to kill her but she had not been taken seriously. Rahmat confirms that he and Banaz have been threatened with death because they'd been seen kissing and their relationship was deemed improper; he claimed the threats were initiated by Ari Mahmod and had been reported to the police two days before Banaz went missing.

Police appeal for information but are met with silence, Banaz's family and the wider Kurdish community close ranks and two of the men from Banaz's list have already fled to Iraq. DC Sarah Raymond discovers that Banaz has an elder sister, Bekhal, who is estranged from the Mahmod family, she ran away from home to avoid a forced marriage and to escape the threats and violence she endured when she rebelled. Bekhal later divulges that, after she left home, her brother had attempted to kill her and had been paid by their father to do it. One of the missing suspects, Mohammed Hama, comes out of hiding and attends the police station. He is arrested and while in custody his telephone calls are recorded; Nawzad Gelly translates the content and informs DCI Goode that Hama is openly boasting about how Banaz was raped, killed and her body disposed of.

The focus shifts to finding Banaz's remains which, based on car tracking, phone data and information gleaned from Hama's recorded conversations, are found buried in a suitcase in a Birmingham suburb. The circumstantial evidence mounts and Hama, despite being warned, continues to talk openly and further implicate his co-conspirators via recorded phone calls; ultimately he concedes his involvement and pleads guilty to a murder charge. The case against Ari and Mahmod Mahmod goes to trial, with Rahmat and Bekhal as the main prosecution witnesses. A contingent from within the Kurdish community attend the trial in support of the men and erupt with displeasure as the jury find both brothers guilty of murder.

After giving evidence, Rahmat and Bekhal are compelled to enter the witness protection programme. The drama closes with DCI Goode, DS Andy Craig and DS Stuart Reeves viewing the Operation Baidland investigation link chart, which now has only two profiles remaining, those of the two men who fled to Iraq. DS Reeves ponders whether they'll pursue the men in Iraq, DCI Goode responds, "we're going to the ends of the earth if we have to".

== Cast ==
- Keeley Hawes as DCI Caroline Goode
- Rhianne Barreto as Bekhal Mahmod
- Moe Bar-El as Rahmat Suleimani
- Alexa Davies as Keilly Jones
- Nasser Memarzia as Nawzad Gelly
- Mark Stanley as DS Andy Craig
- Michael Jibson as DS Stuart Reeves
- Buket Kömür as Banaz Mahmod
- Amanda Lawrence as DC Sarah Raymond
- Ahd Kamel as Diana Nammi
- Umit Ulgen as Mahmod Mahmod
- Selva Rasalingam as Ari Mahmod
- Waj Ali as Mohammed Hama
- Fisun Burgess as Behya Mahmod
- David Kennedy as Det Chief Supt Phil Adams
- Farzana Dua Elahe as Bobbie Cheema

== Episodes ==
No.	Title	Directed by	Written by	Original release date	UK viewers (millions)
1	"Episode 1"	Richard Laxton	Gwyneth Hughes	28 September 2020	6.98
2	"Episode 2"	Richard Laxton	Gwyneth Hughes	29 September 2020	6.06

== Reception ==
The drama received mixed reviews, some were critical that the focus was on DCI Caroline Goode and the investigation, as opposed to Banaz Mahmod herself. Anita Singh of The Daily Telegraph wrote that Banaz was "reduced to a bit part in her own murder". and Flora Carr of the Radio Times wrote that it is a "very good drama, but whether or not it assuages its critics' early fears remains to be seen".

In The Guardian, Chitra Ramaswamy, gave Honour four stars, writing that the drama "makes for haunting television ... this is no white-saviour narrative. The central theme (...) is the police force's abject failure to protect a terrified British citizen (...) Honour possesses a quiet authenticity that comes partly from Hawes – her performance is a study in controlled anguish – and partly from the way it was brought to television. Both the real-life Goode and Bekhal ... consulted on the production, and it shows. Rachel Cooke, writing in the New Statesman, called it a "moving, vital drama" about honour killings, and that it was "deftly, delicately done", "It was so delicately done. If there was horror, sorrow and respect were the more important things". Paul Hirons, writing for The Killing Times, referred to the drama as "frantic, emotional and extremely harrowing". Further, "Writer Gwyneth Hughes does a fine job of telling the story of the search for Banaz with tension and pace – it's a stripped-down, purely procedural narrative with Goode and her team joining the dots"; "this was a very well staged drama and very well played. Keeley Hawes was on top form ... as was the supporting cast. In the end though, this was about Banaz Mahmod. People failed her. They all failed her".

== See also ==
- Murder of Banaz Mahmod
- Banaz: A Love Story
