= Share (2015 film) =

- Official poster
- Directed by: Pippa Bianco
- Written by: Pippa Bianco
- Produced by: Tyler Byrne; Andrew Kelly; Danielle Oexmann
- Starring: Taissa Farmiga; Keir Gilchrist; Madisen Beaty; Andre Royo
- Cinematography: Ava Berkofsky
- Edited by: Oliver Harwood
- Production company: American Film Institute
- Distributed by: Memory
- Release dates: March 14, 2015 (SXSW); May 3, 2016 (Internet)
- Running time: 11 minutes
- Country: United States
- Language: English
- Budget: $25,000

Share is a 2015 American short drama film written and directed by Pippa Bianco, and starring Taissa Farmiga, Keir Gilchrist, Madisen Beaty, and Andre Royo. It follows a teenage girl (Farmiga) as she returns to school after an explicit video of her goes viral online.

Share had its world premiere at South by Southwest on March 14, 2015, where it won the Special Jury Recognition Award for Narrative Short. It was then selected as the only American short film at the 2015 Cannes Film Festival, where it won the first prize Cinéfondation Award. The film received a limited window online release on May 3, 2016, by Memory.

== Plot ==
High schooler Krystal Williams receives various text messages from friends asking whether she is the girl featured in a sexual assault video. As she watches the video, she immediately becomes upset. At school the following day, her best friend Jenna is surprised that she has shown up given the circumstances. In the middle of class, Krystal notices her boyfriend Dylan using his phone, and decides to send him a text message. While composing the message, she receives another text with the video attached, and accidentally plays it out loud.

Her teacher Mr. White notices the sound and takes away her phone, telling her to come back at the end of the day to collect it. Once school ends, she retrieves her phone from Mr. White, who asks if everything is okay. On her way out of school, Dylan follows Krystal to the parking lot and the two talk about the situation. Krystal wonders if more than one person was in the room at the time of her assault, to which Dylan says he doesn't know. Back at home, Krystal ignores the text messages she is receiving on her phone.

== Cast ==
- Taissa Farmiga as Krystal Williams
- Keir Gilchrist as Dylan
- Madisen Beaty as Jenna
- Andre Royo as Mr. White

== Production ==
=== Development ===
Pippa Bianco wrote a screenplay for Share, which was then selected as one of eight short films for the 2014 American Film Institute's Directing Workshop for Women. The annual program requires all of its participants to complete a short film within the year of selection. Bianco collaborated with producers Tyler Byrne (Blue Ruin), Andrew Kelly and Danielle Oexmann to produce the short film. Carly Hugo (The War Boys, Higher Ground) also served as an executive producer. The budget of the film was partially funded from donations through the crowdfunding website Indiegogo. Part of the money donated was given to the Rape, Abuse & Incest National Network (RAINN) because of the subject matter involved in the film.

=== Casting ===
On August 27, 2014, director Pippa Bianco officially confirmed the principal cast members of the film and their subsequent roles through the film's Indiegogo page. Taissa Farmiga portrays Krystal Williams, the lead character and the victim of sexual assault; Keir Gilchrist plays the role of Krystal's boyfriend Dylan, the boy who made the video; Madisen Beaty portrays Jenna, Krystal's best friend; and Andre Royo portrays Krystal's concerned teacher Mr. White.

=== Filming ===
Principal photography for the film occurred over four days – beginning on July 28, 2014 – and took place in various locations around Los Angeles County, including Ramona Convent Secondary School in Alhambra, California and South Gate Middle School in South Gate, California. Filming concluded for the project on July 31, 2014.

== Release ==
Share had its world premiere on March 14, 2015, at the South by Southwest Film Festival in Austin, Texas. The film then premiered at the Directing Workshop for Women Showcase in Los Angeles on May 14, 2015. The film had its European premiere at the 68th Cannes Film Festival, where it was chosen as the only American short film in the official program.

Share also played in Toronto on September 12, 2015, as part of Memory's Program No. 1, and screened at the Raindance Film Festival in London on October 4, 2015. The film was released on May 3, 2016, through Vimeo, for a limited time window, as part of Memory Presents: Program No. 1.

== Reception ==
=== Critical response ===
Mason Walker of Loser City gave Share a positive review, writing, "From that opening shot, the film, for the most part, stays the course; it rarely lets us out of Krystal's shoes. By manipulating sound and image, Bianco shows us how the trauma of sexual assault and public humiliation can make a mundane school day come horribly alive." Walker added of Farmiga's performance, "Oliver Harwood's editing lingers just long enough to catch some of Taissa Farmiga's most chilling facial expressions. Farmiga's performance has many good qualities, but it's even more notable for what it lacks – namely, artifice. She never overplays Krystal's trauma. Instead, she understands that, like many a high school girl, Krystal is trying to hide it – even if the hiding only makes it shine through with terrible transparency."

Following the film's screening at the Maryland Film Festival, Eric Kohn of IndieWire selected Share as one of the best new American shorts, writing, "Bianco's approach to depicting teen girl Krystal coming to grips with video documentation of her sexual assault is in tune with many tropes of European art cinema – its long, engrossing takes on par with the Dardenne brothers and a voyeuristic quality reminiscent of Michael Haneke."

=== Accolades ===
Year	Award	Category	Recipient(s)	Result	Ref
2015	South by Southwest Film Festival	Special Jury Award for Narrative Short	Share	Won	
2015	South by Southwest Film Festival	Grand Jury Award for Narrative Short	Share	Nominated	
2015	2015 Cannes Film Festival	Cinéfondation Award	Share	Won	
2015	Provincetown International Film Festival	Jury Award for Best Student Short Film	Share	Won	
2015	San Joaquin International Film Festival	Special Jury Award for Achievement in Directing	Pippa Bianco	Won	
2015	AFI Fest 2015	Grand Jury Prize – Live Action Short Film	Share	Nominated	
2016	31st Artios Awards	Outstanding Achievement in Casting – Short Film	Lauren Grey	Nominated	

== Feature adaptation ==
In May 2015, it was reported by Variety that the film's writer and director Pippa Bianco is adapting the short into a feature-length screenplay at the production company Parkwood Entertainment. In January 2016, the Sundance Institute picked up the film for their Screenwriters Lab. In March 2017, it was reported that production company A24 had boarded the feature-length adaptation, with newcomer Rhianne Barreto replacing Farmiga in the main role. The full-length film had its world premiere at the Sundance Film Festival in January 2019 to generally positive reviews. HBO Films acquired distribution rights to the film, premiering July 27, 2019.
