= Jordan Peters =

Jordan Peters may refer to:

- Jordan Peters (curler)
- Jordan Peters (actor)
