= Everything I Know About Love (TV series) =

UK television series

- Based on: Everything I Know About Love by Dolly Alderton
- Written by: Dolly Alderton
- Directed by: China Moo-Young & Julia Ford
- Country of origin: United Kingdom
- Original language: English
- No. of seasons: 1
- No. of episodes: 7

Production
- Executive producers: Tim Bevan; Eric Fellner; Surian Fletcher-Jones; Jo McClellan
- Producer: Simon Maloney
- Production companies: Working Title Television; Universal International Studios

Original release
- Network: BBC One (UK); Peacock (US)
- Release: 8 June – 21 July 2022

Everything I Know About Love is a British comedy-drama television series based on Dolly Alderton's fictionalised memoir of the same name, adapted by Alderton herself and produced by Working Title Television for BBC One and Peacock. The seven-part series premiered on 7 June 2022 in the UK. The series later premiered on NBCUniversal's Peacock streaming service in the US on 25 August 2022, with all seven parts dropping at once together.

== Cast and characters ==
- Emma Appleton as Maggie
- Bel Powley as Birdy
- Marli Siu as Nell
- Aliyah Odoffin as Amara
- Connor Finch as Street Baxter
- Ryan Bown as Nathan
- Jordan Peters as Neil
- Juliet Cowan as Joan
- Alexander Lincoln as Rege
- Jill Halfpenny as Roisin
- Craig Parkinson as James

== Production ==
The adaptation was announced at the May 2021 BBC Drama Preview and as part of Working Title Television's then upcoming slate. Alderton herself would write the series and China Moo-Young would direct. Producers included Tim Bevan, Eric Fellner, Surian Fletcher-Jones, and Jo McClellan.

It was announced in August 2021 that Emma Appleton and Bel Powley would star in the series alongside Marli Siu, Aliyah Odoffin, Jordan Peters, Connor Finch, and Ryan Bown.

Principal photography took place in London and Manchester.

== Reception ==
The review aggregator website Rotten Tomatoes reported a 94% approval rating with an average rating of 7.8/10, based on 18 critic reviews. The website's critics consensus reads, "Frothy and a tad bit frivolous, Everything I Know About Love is less about lessons learned than the joy of the journey -- and it's an absolute blast in the bargain." Metacritic, which uses a weighted average, assigned a score of 73 out of 100 based on 8 critics, indicating "generally favorable reviews".
