= Twelve knights of Mariwan =

Kurdish legendary story

The Twelve Knights of Mariwan as well as the Twelve Chevaliers of Marivan (Kurdish: دوانزە سوارەی مەریوان, romanized: Dwanze Swarey Merîwane) are legendary knight warriors from Marivan, a city in the region of East of Kurdistan who ultimately emerged victorious.

== History ==
During the Safavid era, particularly in the 1720s and 1730s, a notable confrontation occurred between a group of rebels and an invading army reportedly numbering 12,000 soldiers. This event, documented in Iranian historical accounts, took place during the rule of Mahmud of Afghanistan in Iran. While the historical sources are somewhat fragmented and lack a precise chronological sequence, it is clear that the events occurred under the Safavid period, during the rule of Ahmad Khan Baban. His capital was in Qalachualan, and he governed a large region until he was replaced by the Ottoman ruler of Baghdad, marking the end of two centuries of Safavid domination and the beginning of a new era.

Records from this period also mention unusual social disturbances, including a proliferation of pigs, which were believed to disrupt wages and provisions. Complaints and grievances were so widespread that people from across the region appealed to Ahmad Shah Jabalbek for assistance. In response, the council compelled him to establish a constitution that appointed soldiers skilled in cavalry and hunting, with the goal of restoring peace to the Jews of the region. Subsequently, the governor issued orders to equip and clothe twelve men, who would later become known as the Twelve Knights. It was said they used military tactics from the Romans, although this is debatable.

== Knights ==
The knights were:

1. Jawamer Agha Rangena - Noori-Aghal family

2. Akhal Agha Siwayli

3. Zainal Beg Masraf

4. Dara Agha Mirade - Mirawdale family

5. Faramarzi Zangana

6. Suwar Agha Balbasi

7. Mamand Agha Mirawdali

8. Shapoor Agha Bakhtiari - Queen Soraya's father came from this tribe.

9. Zulal Agha Margayi

10. Miran Beg Walid Beg Hamwand - Noori-Aghal family

11. Salim Beg

12. Mahmoud Beg Qadimi Bashchawashi

== Traditions ==
The Twelve Knights of Mariwan are celebrated in local traditions for their bravery and strategic military abilities. According to folklore, they defended the town of Marivan against a much larger Safavid army, believed to have numbered around 12,000 soldiers. While the precise historical context of this battle is unclear, the knights actions have been passed down through oral histories and written accounts, reflecting the local cultural memory of resistance.

The battle is described as a significant event during a period when the Kurdish region was contested by multiple powers.

== Battle ==
The horsemen prepared themselves and began pursuing the wild boars, continuing until they reached the city of Azur.

During this time, they received word that the Iranian army had arrived in Marwan and was advancing. (The region was under Ottoman control, following the Ottomans’ takeover of the Afghans after the fall of the Safavids.)

Upon hearing this news, the twelve horsemen discreetly abandoned their hunt and moved to the opposite side of Marwan under cover of night. Their primary objective was to avoid detection while preparing for engagement. Twelve of the men, perceived to be few in number yet appearing numerous, waited until nightfall before launching their actions.

During the night, the knights, using drums, horns, and war cries, built momentum and attacked. After a fierce battle, the Safavid army retreated, leaving their tents behind, and the twelve horsemen of Marivan pursued the fleeing forces.

In the early morning, reinforcements from Qalachulan arrived to confront the Iranians, only to find that the battle had already concluded and the enemy had withdrawn. The atmosphere was one of celebration, though marred by the injury of a young man during the conflict.

The battle between the twelve knights of Mariwan and the invading Safavid army is a prominent episode in Kurdish folklore. Despite being outnumbered, the knights are said to have used guerrilla tactics, taking advantage of their knowledge of the local terrain to harass and delay the enemy. These tactics included ambushes, strategic retreats, and sudden attacks, executed with skill in archery, swordsmanship, and horsemanship.

Although the invading Safavid forces were reportedly much larger—some sources estimate 12,000 soldiers—the knights’ organization and combat skills allowed them to resist the invasion for an extended period. Some accounts suggest that their efforts temporarily prevented the Safavids from establishing control over the region.

== Aftermath ==
The Twelve Knights of Mariwan remain significant figures in Kurdish cultural tradition. Their story has been transmitted through generations via songs, poetry, and oral storytelling. The narrative of their resistance is often interpreted as a symbol of Kurdish resilience and is frequently cited in discussions of the region’s history of defending its sovereignty.

Their legacy continues to influence contemporary Kurdish cultural and political contexts, especially in discussions concerning the defense of one’s homeland and the broader themes of cultural and historical memory within Kurdish communities.
