= Buket Kömür =

British actress

- Born: 21 December 1998 (age 27)
- Education: University of East Anglia
- Years active: 2017–present

Buket Kömür (born 19 December 1998) is a Turkish-British actress. She is known for her roles in the ITV dramas Honour (2020) and Our House (2022), and the Channel 4 horror comedy Generation Z (2024).

== Early life ==
Kömür is from North London and Hertfordshire and watched Turkish television growing up. She graduated from the University of East Anglia (UEA) in 2020 with a degree in film studies and English literature.

== Career ==
Kömür began her career as a YouTube content creator under the alias Buket's Blog. She deleted her YouTube videos in spring 2021. Kömür appeared in the concert 2019 film Roger Waters: Us + Them. This was followed in 2020 by Kömür's television debut in the ITV true crime drama Honour portraying Banaz Mahmod. She also appeared in short films, such as Tin Luck opposite Samuel Adewunmi.

In 2022, Kömür played Wendy in the ITV drama miniseries Our House and appeared in an episode of the Acorn series Signora Volpe. In 2024, she appeared in Amrou Al-Kadhi's film Layla and had a main role in the Channel 4 zombie comedy Generation Z as Kelly. In 2025 she had a supporting role as Nora in the Alibi crime drama Bookish. She played Brandy on Ten Dates video game.

== Filmography ==
=== Film ===
Year	Title	Role	Notes
2019	Roger Waters: Us + Them	Girl	
2019	What is Your Name	Girl	Short film
2020	Tin Luck	Demi	Short film
2023	See You in the Dark	Nora Aslan	Short film
2024	Layla	Sara	

=== Television ===
Year	Title	Role	Notes
2020	Honour	Banaz Mahmod	Miniseries
2022	Our House	Wendy	3 episodes
2022	Signora Volpe	Rabia Yacoub	Episode: "An Anxious Aunt"
2024	Generation Z	Kelly	Main role
2025	Bookish	Nora	12 Episodes

=== Video games ===
- Ten Dates (2023) as Brandy
