= Elliot Edusah =

British actor (born 1997)

- Born: 9 March 1997 (age 29); London, England
- Education: BRIT School; LAMDA (BA)
- Occupation: Actor
- Years active: 2016–present

Elliot Edusah (born 9 March 1997) is a British actor. He is best known for his roles as Private Grey on the Sam Mendes's war film 1917 and as Cappo in the 2021 film Pirates. On television, he is known for his roles in Steve McQueen's Small Axe (2020) and the Paramount+ series The Crow Girl (2025–).

== Early life ==
Edusah was born on 9 March 1997 in London, England, UK, He attended the BRIT School. He graduated with a Bachelor of Arts (BA) from the London Academy of Music and Dramatic Art (LAMDA).

== Career ==
Edusah's career began at the National Theatre's international touring production of Inua Ellams's Barbershop Chronicles. He portrayed Samuel during the production's regional and international tour. Following his stage success and after his work on Barbershop Chronicles, Edusah later moved into screen acting with supporting roles in film and television. In 2019, he appeared as a British soldier in Sam Mendes's war film 1917. In 2020, he appeared in the BBC television film Sitting in Limbo, the Netflix science fiction film Outside the Wire, and Alex Wheatle, an episode of Steve McQueen's anthology series Small Axe.

In 2021, Edusah took his first leading film role in Pirates, He played Cappo, the manager of the Ice Cold Crew. In 2023, Edusah joined the principal cast of the television series Django, a Western co-produced by Sky and Canal+. He portrayed Andrew Ellis, a Unionist soldier involved in the Battle of Gettysburg, alongside Matthias Schoenaerts and Noomi Rapace.

Edusah joined the cast of The Crow Girl, In 2024 a psychological crime thriller television series. Adapted by Milly Thomas from the Scandinavian noir novels by Erik Axl Sund. He reprised the role for the series second season, which premiered in July 2026. During this period, Edusah was also cast in Mike Leigh's comedy-drama feature film, Hard Truths.

== Filmography ==
=== Film ===
Year	Title	Role	Notes
2016	The Habit of Beauty	Dex	
2018	Gone (After Lysistrata)	Tay	Short film
2019	1917	Private Grey	
2021	Outside the Wire	Adams	
2021	Pirates	Cappo	
2024	Hard Truths	Sofa Client	

=== Television ===
Year	Title	Role	Notes
2020	Sitting in Limbo	David	Television film
2020	Small Axe	Valin	Anthology: Alex Wheatle
2023	Django	Andrew Ellis	2 episodes
2025–present	The Crow Girl	Mike Dilliston	Main role

== Stage ==
Year	Title	Role	Notes
2018	Barbershop Chronicles	Samuel	National Theatre, London
