= Reda Elazouar =

British actor (born 1999)

- Born: 1999 (age 26–27); London, England
- Occupation: Actor
- Years active: 2018–present
- Known for: Sex Education; Maigret

Reda Elazouar (born 1999) is a British actor. He was named a 2022 face to watch by The Observer. He starred in the film Pirates (2021). On television, he appeared in the fourth series of the Netflix comedy-drama Sex Education (2023) and the PBS series Maigret (2025).

== Early life ==
Elazouar was born in London to a Moroccan family, and grew up on the Doddington and Rollo Estate in Battersea, South London. He attended a Catholic primary school, though he comes from a Muslim background. He spent three years in Muscat, Oman, where he went to an international school. Upon returning to London at age 10, Elazouar took Saturday acting classes with RaAw London in Camden and Battersea Arts Centre. He deferred his acceptance to study Biomedicine at University College London (UCL) in order to pursue acting at the Identity School of Acting.

== Career ==
Elazouar made his television debut in an episode of the 2018 BBC One miniseries The Little Drummer Girl. This was followed by a two-episode arc as Imran Qureshi in the soap opera EastEnders, also on BBC One. He appeared in the 2020 Channel 4 crime thriller Baghdad Central as Ali Jabani.

In 2021, Elazouar starred in Reggie Yates's debut feature Pirates. He also appeared in the science fiction films Outside the Wire, on Netflix, and Voyagers.

Elazouar joined the cast of the Netflix comedy-drama Sex Education for its fourth and final series as Beau in 2023. In 2024, he voiced Yaseen in Mohamed-Zain Dada's play Dizzy at the Tanya Moiseiwitsch Playhouse in Sheffield and the Half Moon Theatre in London and appeared on stage in Talking People at the Bush Theatre. In 2025, Elazouar had a main role as Detective Karim Lapointe in the PBS Masterpiece series Maigret and one in the film The Family Plan 2.

== Filmography ==
=== Film ===
Year	Title	Role	Notes
2019	Queen of Hearts	Man at Bar	Short film
2021	Outside the Wire	Harris	
2021	YO!	Jacob	Short film
2021	Voyagers	Mallick	
2021	Pirates	Kidda	
2022	Subs	Mason	Short film
2024	Two Places at Once	Sami	Short film
2025	The Family Plan 2	Omar	

=== Television ===
Year	Title	Role	Notes
2018	The Little Drummer Girl	Kareem	1 episode
2019	EastEnders	Imran Qureshi	2 episodes
2020	Baghdad Central	Ali Jabani	2 episodes
2023	Sex Education	Beau	8 episodes (series 4)
2025	Maigret	Detective Karim LaPointe	Main role

== Stage ==
Year	Title	Role	Notes
2024	Dizzy	Yaseen	Voice role; Tanya Moiseiwitsch Playhouse, Sheffield / Half Moon Theatre, London
2024	Why a Black Woman Will Never Be Prime Minister	Rafiq	Voice role; Camden People's Theatre, London
2024	Talking People		Bush Theatre, London

== Audio ==
Year	Title	Role	Notes
2024	Doctor Who: Classic Doctors New Monsters	Carl Dassin	Big Finish Productions
2024	The Strange Case	Nick	Podcast
