= Bookish (TV series) =

British television series (2025–present)

- Genre: Mystery; Crime drama Period drama
- Created by: Mark Gatiss
- Written by: Mark Gatiss; Matthew Sweet; Ian Hallard
- Directed by: Carolina Giammetta
- Starring: Mark Gatiss; Polly Walker; Elliot Levey; Connor Finch; Buket Kömür; Blake Harrison
- Theme music composer: Sarah Warne
- Countries of origin: United Kingdom; Belgium
- Original language: English
- No. of series: 2
- No. of episodes: 12

Production
- Executive producers: Mark Gatiss; Carolina Giammetta; Jo McGrath; Walter Iuzzolino
- Producer: Christopher Arcache
- Running time: 48 minutes
- Production companies: Eagle Eye Drama; Happy Duck Films

Original release
- Network: U&Alibi
- Release: 16 July 2025 – present

Bookish is a British crime drama television series created by and starring Mark Gatiss. It was renewed for a second series prior to the broadcast of the first series. A Christmas two-part special is due to air in December 2026, and a third series has been commissioned.

== Synopsis ==
An unconventional used books shop owner, Gabriel Book, helps police solve crimes in 1946 London. It also follows the story of Gabriel's marriage to Trottie, a lavender marriage. Book’s interest in Jack, a recently released petty criminal whom he hires to work in the bookshop, is another thread through the first series.

== Cast ==
=== Main cast ===
- Mark Gatiss as Gabriel Book
- Polly Walker as Trottie Book
- Elliot Levey as Inspector Bliss
- Connor Finch as Jack
- Buket Kömür as Nora
- Blake Harrison as Sergeant Morris

=== Recurring cast ===
- Rosie Cavaliero as Mrs Dredge
- Gerard Horan as Baseheart
- Nadia Albina as Dr Calder
- Jonas Nay as Felix
- Tim McInnerny as D (series 1)
- Simon Callow as E (series 2)
- Rupert Graves as Colonel Reggie Winters (series 2)

=== Guest cast ===
- Daniel Mays as Eric Wellbeloved
- Ella Bruccoleri as Merula Harkup
- Tom Forbes as Mickey Hall
- Joely Richardson as Sandra Dare
- Jacob Fortune-Lloyd as Stewart Howard
- Amanda Drew as Nerina Bean
- Luke Norris as Jesse Mackendrick
- Michael Workéyè as Billy
- Paul McGann as Mr Kind
- Angeliki Papoulia as Princess Ruhije
- Rina Krasniqi as Princess Nafije
- Mark Umbers as Victor Orr
- Elizabeth Berrington as Sylvia Orr
- Jason Watkins as Harold Sneed
- Saffron Coomber as Ayesha
- Sorcha Groundsell as Geraldine Mercer
- Sid Sagar as Professor Chopra
- Youssef Kerkour as Yusuf
- Allan Corduner as Maxie Kleinmann
- Liza Sadovy as Ruth Kleinmann
- Oli Fyne as Hannah Krasinski
- Claire Skinner as Mrs Calthrop
- Ruth Codd as India Flynn
- Michael Simkins as Luther Von Bode
- Miranda Richardson as Duchess Alberta
- Naoko Mori as Madam Yamauchi
- Ingrid Oliver as Liesl Pohl

=== Series overview ===
| Series | Episodes | Originally released |
|---|---|---|
| 1 | 6 | 16 July 2025 |
| 2 | 6 | 26 August 2026 |

== Episodes ==
=== Series 1 (2025) ===
| No. overall | No. in series | Title | Directed by | Written by | Original release date |
|---|---|---|---|---|---|
| 1 | 1 | "Slightly Foxed: Part 1" | Carolina Giammetta | Mark Gatiss | 16 July 2025 |
Jack, a young man recently released from prison, is offered a job at Book's used books shop, owned by Gabriel Book, who is assisted by his neighbour Nora. His wife, Trottie, owns a wallpaper shop next door. Book's hobby is assisting the Metropolitan Police with difficult investigations. He is called by his friend, Inspector Bliss, to a World War II bombsite where a plague pit with a number of skeletons has been uncovered. Meanwhile a chemist neighbour is found dead.
| 2 | 2 | "Slightly Foxed: Part 2" | Carolina Giammetta | Mark Gatiss | 16 July 2025 |
The boyfriend of the chemist's daughter is brought into Bow Street Police Station for questioning. He tells them that he saw the cleaning lady furtively leaving the chemist's and that later a disguised man entered the chemist's. When he later broke into the chemist's, he found the chemist dead. Book informs the Inspector that there have been two murders, which are connected. Jack wants to know why Book arranged for him in particular to be sent to the shop after his release from prison.
| 3 | 3 | "Deadly Nitrate: Part 1" | Carolina Giammetta | Matthew Sweet and Mark Gatiss | 16 July 2025 |
A film is being made using the exteriors of Book's and Trottie's shops. One of the extras dies after eating a strychnine-laced chocolate bonbon apparently intended for Sandra Dare, the star, although it might have been sent to her fiancé and leading man, Stewart Howard. Jack finds a photo of his father in Trottie's room. Book arranges that Jack takes over as Stewart's stand-in and assistant. When Book and Jack visit the film studio, they find Nerina Bean, a film magazine gossip columnist, dead at the bottom of the basement stairs.
| 4 | 4 | "Deadly Nitrate: Part 2" | Carolina Giammetta | Matthew Sweet and Mark Gatiss | 16 July 2025 |
One of the extras tells the Inspector and Book that Nerina was writing a story about a secret related to the film. Book finds ink on Nerina's palm, the partial name of something she had been holding. Someone tries to poison the film's writer and director with strychnine-laced coffee but Trottie saves him. Trottie and Book try to explain their relationship to Jack.
| 5 | 5 | "Such Devoted Sisters: Part 1" | Carolina Giammetta | Matthew Sweet and Mark Gatiss | 16 July 2025 |
Two Balkan princesses, deposed by Communists, hire Jack as a bodyguard while they live at the Walsingham Hotel. Trottie meets Jack in the bar of the Walsingham, weeks after he left Book's. She is there with a friend, Captain Orr, who is drunk and makes a pass at a maid, Eadie. Soon after, Orr dies after taking a sip of a cocktail, apparently meant for one of the princesses. A one-eyed cigarette-smoking man had asked Book to keep an eye on the princesses, who are receiving death threats, and reminded Book that "they" helped find Jack. Book recalls that in 1935 Jack's father refused to leave Nazi Germany with Book. Book hears a gunshot from the princesses's room. When he rushes in to investigate, he is shot at.
| 6 | 6 | "Such Devoted Sisters: Part 2" | Carolina Giammetta | Matthew Sweet and Mark Gatiss | 16 July 2025 |
Eadie mistakenly delivered champagne to the princesses's room, instead of the Books's. They suspected an assassination attempt and shot at her and then Book. Book is unharmed but Eadie has been slightly wounded in her arm. She demands to stay in the Walsingham's Royal Suite overnight in compensation. Book informs the Inspector that Eadie is a member of the Communist Party. The princesses receive another death threat. Book tells Jack that he knew Jack's father before the War and that he died.

=== Series 2 (2026) ===
| No. overall | No. in series | Title | Directed by | Written by | Original release date |
|---|---|---|---|---|---|
| 7 | 1 | "Memento Mori: Part 1" | Carolina Giammetta | Mark Gatiss | 26 August 2026 |
| 8 | 2 | "Memento Mori: Part 2" | Carolina Giammetta | Mark Gatiss | 26 August 2026 |
| 9 | 3 | "Dead Man's Whistle: Part 1" | Carolina Giammetta | Mark Gatiss and Mathew Sweet | 2 September 2026 |
| 10 | 4 | "Dead Man's Whistle: Part 2" | Carolina Giammetta | Mark Gatiss and Mathew Sweet | 2 September 2026 |
| 11 | 5 | "Killer Nacht: Part 1" | Carolina Giammetta | Mark Gatiss and Ian Hallard | 9 September 2026 |
| 12 | 6 | "Killer Nacht: Part 2" | Carolina Giammetta | Mark Gatiss and Ian Hallard | 9 September 2026 |

=== Christmas Special (2026) ===
| No. overall | No. in series | Title | Directed by | Written by | Original release date |
|---|---|---|---|---|---|
| 1 | 1 | "The Crown of Destiny: Part 1" | TBA | TBA | TBA |
| 2 | 2 | "The Crown of Destiny: Part 2" | TBA | TBA | TBA |

== Production ==
The six-part first series is produced by Eagle Eye Drama and is produced in association with Belgium-based Happy Duck Films. Jo McGrath and Walter Iuzzolino are executive producers and the series is co-written by Mark Gatiss and Matthew Sweet. Carolina Giammetta is the director and Christopher Arcache is the producer.

The cast is led by Gatiss, with Polly Walker, Elliott Levey, Connor Finch and Buket Kömür. The cast also includes Blake Harrison, Rosie Cavaliero, Jacob Fortune-Lloyd, Tom Forbes, Joely Richardson, Daniel Mays, Amanda Drew and Luke Norris.

Filming got underway in Belgium in April 2024. It was renewed for a second series prior to the broadcast of the first series. Special guest stars confirmed for the second series include Ruth Codd, Jason Watkins, Miranda Richardson, Simon Callow, Rupert Graves, Claire Skinner and Youssef Kerkour.

Gatiss revealed on Instagram that filming has officially wrapped on Season 2, which will have six episodes. It airs in the UK on 26 August 2026.

== Broadcast ==
The series was broadcast on 16 July 2025 on U&Alibi in the UK, and HBO Max in Australia. It started showing in the Netherlands on 30 September 2025 on BBC NL. Season 2 started showing in the Netherlands on 17 November 2026 on BBC NL.
