= Lorna Doone (1990 film) =

British TV drama

- DVD cover
- Based on: Lorna Doone by R. D. Blackmore
- Directed by: Andrew Grieve
- Starring: Polly Walker; Sean Bean; Clive Owen
- Theme music composer: Julian Nott
- Country of origin: United Kingdom
- Original language: English

Production
- Producers: Alan Horrox; Antony Root
- Running time: 87 minutes
- Production company: Thames Television

Original release
- Network: ITV
- Release: 26 December 1990

Lorna Doone is a 1990 British drama television film directed by Andrew Grieve and starring Polly Walker, Sean Bean and Clive Owen. It is based on the 1869 novel Lorna Doone by R. D. Blackmore set in the West Country during Monmouth's Rebellion. It was made by Thames Television and aired on ITV.

== Locations ==
Location filming took place near Glasgow in Scotland rather than the West Country, as producer Alan Horrox explained in The Spectator, "[the novel Lorna Doone] demands sweeping moorland vistas, plunging waterfalls, and a secret valley, as well as much else besides. When we researched the available locations on Exmoor, we discovered that much of the area has changed profoundly since the 17th-century setting of the original novel...I believe it could never successfully evoke the full-blooded dramatic sweep of this classic novel."

== Plot ==
West country yeoman John Ridd (Clive Owen) vows to avenge the death of his father by destroying the land-grabbing Doone family. Then he meets, and immediately falls in love with, the beautiful and innocent Lorna Doone (Polly Walker).

== Cast ==
- Clive Owen as John Ridd
- Sean Bean as Carver Doone
- Polly Walker as Lorna Doone
- Billie Whitelaw as Sarah Ridd
- Miles Anderson as Tom Faggus
- Kenneth Haigh as Judge Jeffreys
- Jane Gurnett as Annie Ridd
- Robert Stephens as Sir Ensor Doone
- Euan Grant Maclachlan as Ensie Doone
- Michael Mackenzie as John Ridd's Father
- Andrew Ferguson as Young John
- Claire Madden as Young Lorna
- Paul Young as Neighbour
- Martin Heller as Priest
- Rachel Kempson as Lady Dugal
- Hugh Fraser as James II

== Critical reception ==
AllMovie called it "one of the more rewarding film adaptations of the venerable R. D. Blackmore novel."
