= Matthew Sweet (writer) =

English journalist, broadcaster, and writer

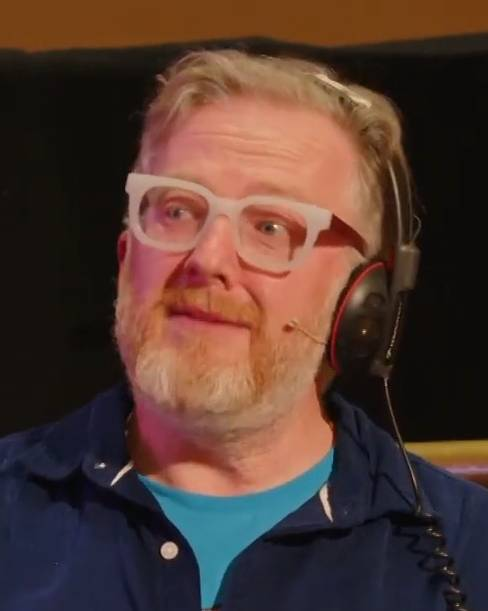
- Sweet chairing an event at the British Library, 2022
- Occupations: Journalist, broadcaster, author, historian
- Writing career
- Genres: Journalism, history

Matthew Sweet is an English journalist, broadcaster, author, and cultural historian.

== Early life ==
Sweet received a doctorate from the University of Oxford on Wilkie Collins.

== Career ==
Sweet was among the contributors to The Oxford Companion to English Literature. He has also been a director's assistant at the Royal Shakespeare Company, a columnist for The Big Issue and a film critic for The Independent on Sunday.

Sweet's book Shepperton Babylon: The Lost Worlds of British Cinema (2005) is a history of Shepperton Studios and the British film business from the silent days, and includes interviews with surviving figures from the period. A television documentary series was adapted from the book.

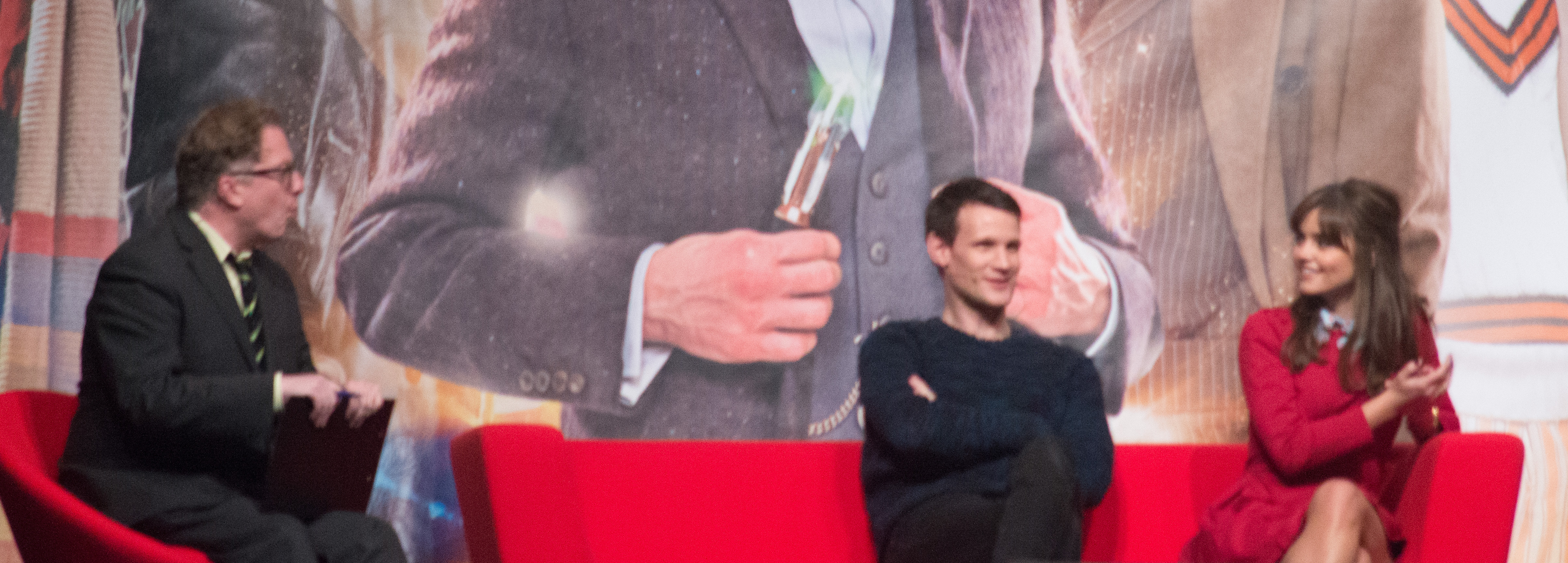
Sweet interviewing Matt Smith and Jenna Coleman at a Doctor Who event in 2013

Sweet has written other television films and series, including Silent Britain, Checking into History, British Film Forever, The Rules of Film Noir, Truly, Madly, Cheaply!: British B Movies, and A Brief History of Fun. He presented a BBC Radio 4 programme The Philosopher's Arms, a show recorded in front of a live audience in which classic philosophical concerns were explored. From 2013 until October 2025 he was the presenter of the BBC Radio 3 programme Sound of Cinema, which is concerned with film scores and their composers, He is also a regular presenter of Night Waves (now titled Free Thinking) on the same network.

Sweet has been interviewed on many documentaries about television for the BBC, Channel 4 and 5. He is a fan of the science fiction television series Doctor Who and has written several Doctor Who audio plays and short stories. He has also presented several documentaries about the series for the DVD range, including Chain Reaction (about The Caves of Androzani) and Nice or Nasty?: The Making of Vengeance on Varos, as well as conducting in-depth interviews with prominent cast and crew members for the Doctor Who: The Collection Blu-ray box sets. He also presented the 50th anniversary retrospective of the series for The Culture Show called Me, You and Doctor Who in 2013. Piers Morgan interviewed him on Good Morning Britain in 2017 about the casting of the first woman to play the Doctor.

In 2024, Sweet was announced as a co-writer of the crime drama television series Bookish with Mark Gatiss.

== Bibliography ==
- Operation Chaos: The Vietnam Deserters Who Fought the CIA, the Brainwashers, and Each Other (2018), Pan Macmillan, ISBN 978-14472-9476-4,
- Inventing the Victorians (2001), debunking the stereotypes and myths about the Victorian Era, Faber and Faber ISBN 0-571-20658-1, St. Martin's Press ISBN 0-312-28326-1 (hardcover, 1st US edition)
- Shepperton Babylon: The Lost Worlds of British Cinema (2005) Faber and Faber ISBN 0-571-21297-2
- The West End Front (2011), Faber and Faber, a history of London's grand hotels during the Second World War
- The New Forest Murders (2025), Simon & Schuster, a murder mystery novel set in World War II
- Bookish (2025), Quercus, novelisation of the television series

== Audio dramas ==
- Doctor Who: Year of the Pig
- Doctor Who: The Magic Mousetrap
- Bernice Summerfield: The Diet of Worms
- Jago and Litefoot: The Man at the End of the Garden
- Jago and Litefoot: The Lonely Clock
- The Voyages of Jago & Litefoot: Voyage to the New World
- Jago and Litefoot: Return of the Repressed
- Jago and Litefoot: Maurice

== Short stories ==
- "The Lampblack Wars" - Short Trips: The History of Christmas
- "The Earwig Archipelago" - Short Trips: Time Signature
