= Share (2019 film) =

- Official poster
- Directed by: Pippa Bianco
- Screenplay by: Pippa Bianco
- Based on: Share by Pippa Bianco
- Produced by: Carly Hugo; Matthew Parker; Tyler Byrne
- Starring: Rhianne Barreto; Charlie Plummer; Poorna Jagannathan; J. C. Mackenzie; Nicholas Galitzine; Lovie Simone
- Cinematography: Ava Berkofsky
- Edited by: Shelby Siegel
- Music by: Shlohmo
- Production companies: A24; Loveless; Wilding Pictures
- Distributed by: HBO Films
- Release dates: January 25, 2019 (Sundance); July 27, 2019 (United States)
- Running time: 89 minutes
- Country: United States
- Language: English

Share is a 2019 coming-of-age drama film, written and directed by Pippa Bianco, based upon Bianco's short film of the same name. It stars Rhianne Barreto, Charlie Plummer, Poorna Jagannathan, J. C. Mackenzie, Nicholas Galitzine, and Lovie Simone.

It had its world premiere at the Sundance Film Festival on January 25, 2019. It was released on July 27, 2019, by HBO Films.

== Plot ==
Mandy, a 16-year-old high school student, wakes up on her front lawn after a night of hard partying with friends. She receives text messages from her friends about a video that has gone viral. In the video, she is face down at the party and obviously unconscious. Her pants have been pulled down, revealing her buttocks, and she is surrounded by a group of sniggering boys. She remembers none of this. Later her friends on the basketball team discover bruises on her lower back; however, she doesn't seek support for the trauma.

When Mandy's parents, Mickey and Kerri, learn what happened, they take her to meet with school administrators. Mandy and other members of the girls' and boys' basketball teams are suspended from the teams for drinking, and she is subject to online bullying. Her parents encourage her to try EMDR therapy to recall details of her assault

Mandy's boyfriend AJ is arrested for "video voyeurism" as he admits having photographed the assault along with other boys. Her friends Jenna and Dylan try to be supportive despite social ostracism and media coverage, but she finds it difficult to accept this help. Principal Marsh tells her and her parents that she is a "distraction" and asks her to study at home.

AJ's father tries to apologize to Mickey, but they end up in a shouting match. When she asks to visit Jenna, her father forbids it. She later goes to a party with Dylan. When he takes her home, she kisses him and he tells her that he took her home on the night of the assault but did not see her pass out on the lawn before he left. He claims he doesn't know what happened to her. Mandy tells her EMDR therapist that she can't recall anything and he admits she may never remember.

Police tell Mandy and her parents that they can't determine who photographed what from the seven phones and two tablets they have examined, so the district attorney can't proceed further. Kerri consults with a lawyer who thinks that if Mandy holds a press conference, she can force the investigation to continue. On the other hand, this might involve relocating the family and undertaking a years-long civil lawsuit.

Mandy decides not to pursue the case any further. After the school prom, Dylan texts her a video showing that he may have taken advantage of her while she was under the influence, but she deletes the video.

== Cast ==
- Rhianne Barreto as Mandy Lundy
- Charlie Plummer as Dylan
- Poorna Jagannathan as Kerri Lundy
- J. C. Mackenzie as Mickey Lundy
- Nicholas Galitzine as A.J.
- Lovie Simone as Jenna
- Danny Mastrogiorgio as Tony
- Jhaleil Swaby as Mason
- Milcania Diaz-Rojas as Mia
- Christian Corrao as Tyler Lundy
- Emily Woloszuk as Kaylee
- Sydney Holmes as Lacey
- Emily Debowski as Pretty Girl
- Ivan Wanis Ruiz as Officer Gregg
- Darlene Cooke as Principal Marsh
- Alison Smiley as Teacher
- Jai Jai Jones as Coach Chauncey
- Kimmy Choi as Reporter
- Anthony Q. Farrell as Psychologist
- Ayesha Mansur Gonsalves as Lawyer

== Production ==
In May 2015, it was announced that Pippa Bianco was adapting her short Share (winner, Cinéfondation section, Cannes 2015) into a feature-length screenplay. In January 2016, the Sundance Institute picked up the film for their Screenwriters Lab. In March 2017, it was announced A24 would distribute the film, with newcomer Rhianne Barreto cast in the lead role. In October 2017, Charlie Plummer, Poorna Jagannathan, J. C. Mackenzie, Lovie Simone and Nicholas Galitzine had been cast in the film, with Carly Hugo, Tyler Byrne and Matthew Parker serving as producers.

Principal photography began in October 2017, in Toronto, Canada.

The music score was done by electronic musician Shlohmo, his first work in film scoring.

The film received The ReFrame Stamp for Gender-Balanced Production.

== Release ==
The film had its world premiere at the Sundance Film Festival on January 25, 2019. Shortly after, HBO Films acquired distribution rights to the film. It was released on July 27, 2019.

== Reception ==
=== Critical response ===
Share received positive reviews from film critics. It holds an 86% approval rating on review aggregator website Rotten Tomatoes, based on 28 reviews, with an average rating of 7/10. The website's critics consensus reads: "Grim yet compelling, Share avoids rote didacticism thanks to sensitive direction and committed central performances." Metacritic, which uses a weighted average, assigned the film a score of 73 out of 100, based on 8 critics, indicating "generally favorable" reviews.

== See also ==
- Post-assault treatment of sexual assault victims
