= Moe Bar-El =

Iranian actor (born 1992)

- Born: 18 May 1992 (age 34); Shiraz, Iran
- Other name: Moe Bargahi
- Years active: 2014–present

Moe Bar-El (born 18 May 1992) is a British-Iranian actor. He earned an affiliate Laurence Olivier Award nomination for his theatre work. On television, he is known for his roles in the Canal+ series The Bureau (2016), the ITV drama Honour (2020) and the FX series Alien: Earth (2025).

== Early life ==
Bar-El was born in Shiraz and moved to London with his mother and brother when he was ten. He attended City and Islington College, where he pursued a Level 3 BTEC National Diploma in Performing Arts from 2010 to 2012. He then trained part-time at Identity School of Acting for three years. He speaks Persian and English.

== Career ==
After appearing in short films and Bola Agbaje's web series Hot Pepper, Bar-El made his television debut in 2016 when he joined the main cast of the French Canal+ political thriller The Bureau for its second season as Shapur Zamani. In 2018, he made his professional stage debut in Moormaid at the Arcola Theatre and Every Day I Make Greatness Happen at the Hampstead Theatre. For the latter, Bar-El was nominated for Outstanding Achievement in an Affiliate Theatre at the 2019 Laurence Olivier Awards. He appeared in the San Francisco production of The Jungle.

In 2020, Bar-El played Karim in the first season of the Apple TV+ spy thriller Tehran and starred as Rahmat Sulemani in the ITV drama Honour. He made his feature film debut with a small role in the 2021 Dutch drama Mitra. He had recurring roles as Reece in the 2022 Amazon Prime science fiction series The Peripheral and Artem in the 2023 BBC One crime drama Better. He went on the Paines Plough tour of You Bury Me.

== Filmography ==
=== Film ===
Year	Title	Role	Notes
2014	C.T.R.L	PJ	Short film
2015	One Day in Whitechapel	Jay	Short film
2016	In the Robot Skies	Tamir	Short film
2017	Tilda & Laila	Ali	Short film
2021	Mitra	Bewaker Raid	
2022	Parousia	Kane	Short film
2023	Femme	Donovan	
2024	Dune: Part Two	Fundamentalist Fighter	
2024	The Return	Elatus	
2025	Words of War	Mosvar Barayev	
TBA	Ghetto Heaven	Iziah Anderson	

=== Television ===
Year	Title	Role	Notes
2015	Hot Pepper	Akram	Web series; episode: "Home Alone"
2016	The Bureau (French: Le Bureau des Légendes)	Shapur Zamani	Main role (season 2); Pictures (season 3), Flashback (season 4)
2017	Snatch	Sheikh Zesan	Episode: "The Smelt Down"
2019	Casualty	Shah Busnal	1 episode
2020	Tehran	Karim	Recurring role (season 1; 4 episodes)
2020	Honour	Rahmat Sulemani	Miniseries
2022	The Peripheral	Reece	4 episodes
2023	Better	Artem	4 episodes
2023	Count Abdulla	Yazan Al Kawalti	
2024	Dinner with the Parents	Paul	2 episodes
2024	We Might Regret This	Will	1 episode
2025	Alien: Earth	Rashidi	4 episodes
2026	Hit Point		

== Stage ==
Year	Title	Role	Notes
2018	Moormaid	Mehdi	Arcola Theatre, London
2018	Every Day I Make Greatness Happen	Kareem	Hampstead Theatre, London
2019	The Jungle	Maz	Curran Theatre, San Francisco
2020	Welcome to Iran	Various	Theatre Royal Stratford East, London
2021	Lockdown and All That / The Monster Inside		Tara Theatre, London
2023	You Bury Me	Tamer	Paines Plough UK tour

== Awards and nominations ==
Year	Award	Category	Work	Result	Ref.
2019	Laurence Olivier Awards	Outstanding Achievement in an Affiliate Theatre	Every Day I Make Greatness Happen	Nominated	
