= Pirates (2021 film) =

2021 British film by Reggie Yates

- Theatrical release poster
- Directed by: Reggie Yates
- Written by: Reggie Yates
- Produced by: Kate Norrish; Polly Leys
- Starring: Elliot Edusah; Reda Elazouar; Jordan Peters; Youssef Kerkour; Kassius Nelson; Rebekah Murrell; Aaron Shosanya; Tosin Cole; Shiloh Coke
- Cinematography: Rachel Clark
- Edited by: Ash White
- Production companies: BBC Film; BFI; Magellanic Media Limited; Hillbilly Films
- Distributed by: Picturehouse Entertainment
- Release date: 26 November 2021
- Running time: 80 minutes
- Country: United Kingdom
- Language: English
- Box office: $133,508

Pirates is a 2021 British comedy film written and directed by Reggie Yates in his feature directorial debut. It stars Elliot Edusah, Reda Elazouar, Jordan Peters, Youssef Kerkour, Kassius Nelson, Rebekah Murrell, Aaron Shosanya, Tosin Cole, and Shiloh Coke. The film was released in cinemas by Picturehouse Entertainment on 26 November 2021. It received critical acclaim.

== Premise ==
In 1999, three friends—Cappo, Kidda and Two Tonne—embark on a mission to attend a New Year's party.

== Cast ==
- Elliot Edusah as Cappo
- Reda Elazouar as Kidda
- Jordan Peters as Two Tonne
- Youssef Kerkour as Uncle Ibbs
- Kassius Nelson as Sophie
- Rebekah Murrell as Kelly
- Aaron Shosanya as Megaman
- Tosin Cole as Clips
- Shiloh Coke as Princess

== Reception ==
=== Box office ===
In the United Kingdom, the film earned $72,008 in its opening weekend, and a total of $133,508 by the end of its run.

=== Critical response ===
On the review aggregator website Rotten Tomatoes, 100% of 26 critics' reviews are positive, with an average rating of 6.8/10. Metacritic, which uses a weighted average, assigned the film a score of 72 out of 100 based on 6 critics, indicating "generally favorable reviews".
