= Alex Wheatle (film) =

2020 film of Small Axe anthology film series

- Publicity poster with still from Alex Wheatle. Note that the actors named at the top appear in other Small Axe films, not this one.
- Written by: Steve McQueen; Alastair Siddons
- Directed by: Steve McQueen
- Country of origin: United Kingdom
- Original language: English

Production
- Running time: 66 minutes

Original release
- Network: BBC One
- Release: 6 December 2020

Alex Wheatle is a 2020 historical drama film directed by Steve McQueen and co-written by McQueen and Alastair Siddons. It stars Sheyi Cole as Alex Wheatle, a Black British novelist who was sentenced to a term of imprisonment after the 1981 Brixton uprising. The film was released as part of the anthology series Small Axe on BBC One on 6 December 2020 and on Amazon Prime Video on 11 December 2020.

== Plot ==
After enduring a childhood in a predominantly white foster home devoid of love or familial bonds, Alex Wheatle, a young Black man, finds himself in Brixton. Here, he not only experiences a sense of community for the first time in his life but also uncovers a profound passion for music. However, Brixton proves to be a tinderbox, and following the three days of unrest in April 1981, he is incarcerated. Yet, within the confines of prison, Alex stumbles upon unexpected opportunities. Encouraged by his fellow inmate Simeon to broaden his horizons, the young man discovers a love for literature and begins to cultivate a certain level of education.

== Cast ==
- Sheyi Cole as Alex Wheatle
  - Asad-Shareef Muhammad as Young Alex Wheatle
- Robbie Gee as Simeon
- Johann Myers as Cutlass Rankin
- Jonathan Jules as Dennis Isaacs
- Elliot Edusah as Valin
- Khali Best as Badger
- Fumilayo Brown-Olateju as Dawn
- Dexter Flanders as Floyd

== Reception ==
On the review aggregator website Rotten Tomatoes, 96% of 47 critics' reviews are positive, with an average rating of 7.4/10. The website's consensus reads: "Sheyi Cole shines in Alex Wheatle, a harrowing biopic that barely scratches the surface of a complex life, but does so with empathy and finesse." Metacritic, which uses a weighted average, assigned the film a score of 77 out of 100, based on 19 critics, indicating "generally favorable" reviews.
