= The Gambler (1997 film) =

- Directed by: Károly Makk
- Screenplay by: Katharine Ogden; Charles Cohen; Nick Dear
- Produced by: Charles Cohen; Frank Jansen; René Seegers; Berry van Zwieten; Marc Vlessing
- Cinematography: Jules van den Steenhoven
- Edited by: Kevin Whelan
- Music by: Brian Lock; Gerard Schurmann
- Release date: 1997
- Country: United Kingdom
- Language: English

The Gambler is a 1997 drama film directed by Károly Makk and starring Michael Gambon, Jodhi May and Polly Walker. It is set around the writing of the 1866 novel The Gambler by Fyodor Dostoyevsky.

The film was notable for its casting of Luise Rainer. The Oscar-winning actress had not made a film in fifty-four years prior to her appearance in this one.

== Plot summary ==
In St. Petersburg in 1866, Fyodor Dostoyevsky must finish his next novel within a month or lose the rights to all his published work, and stenographer Anna Snitkina is hired to get it written.

== Cast ==
- Michael Gambon ... Fyodor Dostoyevsky
- Jodhi May ... Anna Snitkina
- Polly Walker ... Polina
- Dominic West ... Alexei
- Luise Rainer ... Grandmother
- Will Houston ... Pasha
- Johan Leysen ... De Grieux
- John Wood ... The General
- Angeline Ball ... Mlle. Blanche
- Marjon Brandsma ... Mme. de Cominges
- Mark Lacey ... Ivan
- Gijs Scholten van Aschat ... Maikov
- Lucy Davis ... Dunya
- András Fekete ... Potapych
- Patrick Godfrey ... Professor Olkhin
- Greet Groot ... Ustinya
- Tom Jansen ... Stellovsky
- Miklós Székely B. ... Anna's Father
- Vera Venczel ... Anna's Mother
- János Xantus ... Karl
- Ed De Bruin ... Croupier I
- Vittoria De Bruin ... Middle Aged Woman
- Zoltán Gera ... Creditor

== Reception ==
The film has received a 14% rating from the review aggregation website Rotten Tomatoes.
