= Jordan Peters (actor) =

British actor

- Education: LAMDA
- Years active: 2019–present

Jordan Peters is a British actor. His films include Pirates (2021). On television, he is known for his roles in the BBC One series Everything I Know About Love (2022) and the Amazon Prime series My Lady Jane (2024).

== Early life ==
Peters is from South London and attended the BRIT School. He went on to train at the London Academy of Music and Dramatic Art (LAMDA).

== Career ==
Peters made his television debut with a guest appearance in a 2018 episode of Call the Midwife and his feature film debut as Cheddar in Blue Story the following year. He then appeared as Musa in the first series of the Sky Atlantic crime thriller Gangs of London.

In 2021, Peters starred in Reggie Yates's debut feature Pirates. In 2022, Peters played Neil in the BBC One adaptation of Dolly Alderton's Everything I Know About Love and Harry in the Lifetime prequel Flowers in the Attic: The Origin. He also appeared in the Paramount+ series The Flatshare as Asher and the film After Ever Happy as Mark.

As announced in 2022, Peters starred as King Edward, based on Edward VI, in the 2024 Amazon Prime alternate history fantasy series My Lady Jane.

== Filmography ==
=== Film ===
Year	Title	Role	Notes
2019	#Haters	Jay	Short film
2019	Blue Story	Cheddar	
2021	Pirates	Two Tonne	
2022	After Ever Happy	Mark	
TBA	Spirit of Place		

=== Television ===
Year	Title	Role	Notes
2018	Call the Midwife	Ade Babayaro	1 episode
2020	Gangs of London	Musa	2 episodes
2022	Everything I Know About Love	Neil	Miniseries; 5 episodes
2022	Flowers in the Attic: The Origin	Harry	Miniseries; 2 episodes
2022	The Flatshare	Asher	2 episodes
2024	My Lady Jane	King Edward	Main role
