= Diana Nammi =

Kurdish and British activist

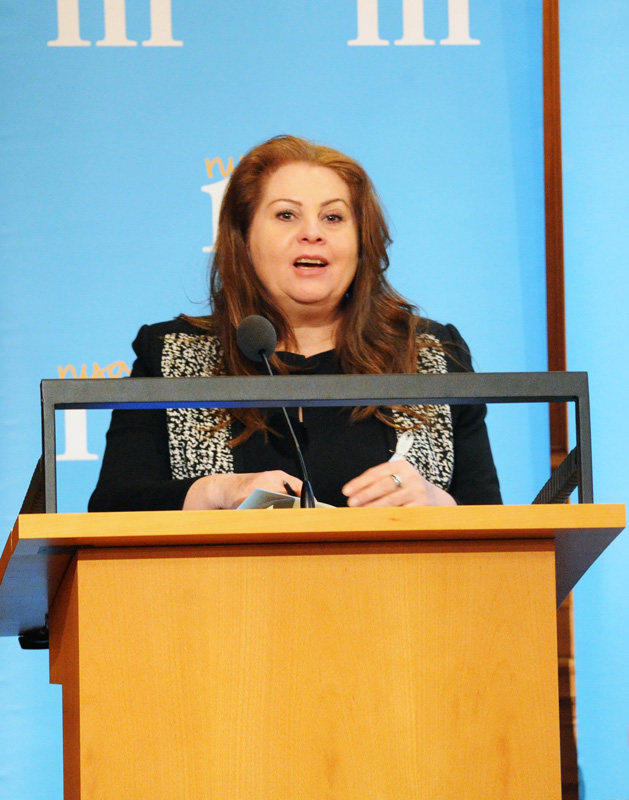
- Nammi in 2014
- Born: Iran
- Occupation: Activist

Diana Nammi is a Kurdish and British activist. She received a Barclays Woman of the Year Award in 2014. She was also named one of the BBC 100 Women in 2014.

== Life ==
Nammi was born in Iran. Her father was a progressive thinker, who inspired her later activist work. Nammi was thrown out of school in Sanandaj at 14 for throwing food at a belligerent teacher who had accused her of being promiscuous. She went on to organize protests in favor of "secularism, equality and human rights" during the 1979 Revolution. Nammi was nearly arrested as a teenager for speaking up for the rights of women. She went on to join up and fight for 12 years as a Peshmerga freedom fighter in Kurdistan, often as a front-line fighter. She continued to speak out for women's rights. She became pregnant in 1991, and fled to Iraq, Turkey, and finally to the United Kingdom in 1996 to raise her child in safety after a chemical bomb attack killed 35 people near the radio station where she worked. Nammi was granted asylum in the UK.

== Activism ==
Nammi founded the Iranian and Kurdish Women's Rights Organization (IKWRO) in her home in 2002. She founded the organization when the translator who helped Nammi and her daughter settle in the United Kingdom was killed. The translator was killed by her own husband, and the police did not wish to call it an "honor crime" as they believed it was an issue of culture. Nammi was outraged, and founded the organization to argue against "us[ing] culture to justify murdering women." IWKRO strove to provide counseling and advice for women that were from the Middle East, North Africa, or Afghanistan or raised in their communities. As of 2014, the organization had 16 paid staff and has helped over 780 women in-person. Nammi has been an outspoken advocate against honor killings, forced marriage, female genital mutilation, and the rights of women to divorce in religious marriages. The IKWRO works to provide women with legal access and safe places for women to go for refuge. The organization also works to bring issues of honor attacks and honor killings to the attention of the larger public. In 2013, Nammi joined The National Commission on Forced Marriage to help eliminate practices of forced marriage in the United Kingdom. Nammi and her organization were central in getting two of the killers of Banaz Mahmod, who was killed in an honor killing, extradited to the United Kingdom for prosecution. This was the first ever extradition of its kind. Nammi organized a campaign, entitled "Justice for Banaz," that called for the extradition. The men were later convicted. Nammi considers this extradition her chief success. Nammi also played a central role in changing law in the UK to ban forced marriage. Nammi continually advocates for schools, police, and other sources of services to the public to be educated on how to help victims of forced marriage or honor violence.

== Honors ==
In 2012, Nammi was named one of the 150 Women Who Shake The World by Newsweek and The Daily Beast. Nammi received a Barclays Woman of the Year Award in 2014. Nammi also received a Women on the Move Award from UNHCR in 2014. Also in 2014, she was named one of the BBC's 100 Women. She received a Voices of Courage Award from the Women's Refugee Commission in 2015. Also in 2015, in recognition of her contributions to legal issues, she was named a part of the Inspired by Law gallery by students at London South Bank University. In same year, she was named one of the Women of the Year by the magazine Red. In 2016, she was awarded an honorary degree from the University of Essex.

She speaks in publicly regularly to defend the rights of women. Her TEDx speech has been viewed thousands of times of YouTube.

== Further media ==
- Nammi speaking with the BBC about honor killing statistics in the UK
- Diana Nammi's TEDxEastEnd talk
- Tribute video to Nammi by the Women on the Move Awards 2014

== See also ==
- Women's rights in Iran
