= Rhianne Barreto =

English actress

- Born: c. 1998; Kensington and Chelsea, London, England
- Occupation: Actress
- Years active: 2016–present

Rhianne Gabrielle H. Barreto (born c. 1998) is a British actress. Her work includes the film Share (2019), the ITV drama Honour (2020), and as Rani Rekowski in the BBC One and Amazon Prime Video series The Outlaws (2021–).

== Early life and education ==
Rhianne Gabrielle H. Barreto was born around 1998 in Kensington and Chelsea, one of nine children to mother Tracey Barreto, who is British, and father Ramsey Barreto, who was born in Iraq and is of Indian and Portuguese heritage.

She attended Bishop Ramsey School, the National Youth Theatre and the BRIT School.

== Career ==
In 2018, Barreto was named as one of the Screen International Stars of Tomorrow.

She appeared in the 2019 Amazon Prime Video action drama series Hanna (2019) and won the Breakthrough Performance award at the 2019 Sundance Film Festival for her role in Share.

Barreto co-starred alongside Keeley Hawes in the 2020 ITV drama series Honour, in which she played the sister of real-life murder victim Banaz Mahmod.

She is one of the seven members of the ensemble cast in the comic crime thriller series The Outlaws, which premiered on BBC One and Amazon Prime Video in 2021. A second series, filmed concurrently, was released in June 2022, with a third series on 30 May 2024.

She appears as British student Meredith Kercher in The Twisted Tale of Amanda Knox, premiering August 2025, a Hulu mini-series.

== Filmography ==
=== Film ===
| Year | Title | Role | Notes |
|---|---|---|---|
| 2019 | Signs | Mariam | Short film |
| 2019 | Share | Mandy Lundy | |

=== Television ===
| Year | Title | Role | Notes |
|---|---|---|---|
| 2016 | Fright Bites | Natalie | Episode: "Tickle Monster" |
| 2017 | Little Boy Blue | Girl | 1 episode |
| 2018 | Strike Back | Maya | Episode: "Retribution: Part 6" |
| 2019 | Hanna | Sophie | Season 1; 5 episodes |
| 2020 | Isolation Stories | Carly | Episode: "Mel" |
| 2020 | Honour | Bekhal Mahmod | Miniseries |
| 2021–2024 | The Outlaws | Rani Rekowski | Main role |
| 2023 | No Escape | Kitty | Main role |
| 2025 | The Twisted Tale of Amanda Knox | Meredith Kercher | |

=== Web ===
| Year | Title | Role | Notes |
|---|---|---|---|
| 2017 | Dixi | Scarlett | 40 episodes |

== Audio ==
| Year | Title | Role | Notes |
|---|---|---|---|
| 2020 | Day by Day | Stella | Podcast episode: "At the Peak of it All" |

== Awards and nominations ==
| Year | Award | Category | Work | Result | Ref |
|---|---|---|---|---|---|
| 2019 | Sundance Film Festival | Achievement in Acting | Share | Won | |
