= Caroline Goode =

British retired police detective

Caroline Goode QPM
- Occupation: Police detective
- Known for: Expert in honour based violence

Caroline Goode QPM is a retired British police detective, who served for 33 years in the Metropolitan Police in London and in Counter Terrorism Command. During her 10 years in the Met, Goode investigated over 100 murders over the course of 10 years, the most high-profile being the murder of Banaz Mahmood. Goode retired at the rank of Detective Superintendent.

Goode led the investigation into the 2006 disappearance of Banaz Mahmod, which later became a murder investigation. Good's work on the case involved convictions of the first-ever men extradited from Iraq to the UK. They were jailed for more than 20 years each. Goode wrote a book about the case. The investigation was also the subject of the two-part TV mini-series, Honour, starring Keeley Hawes as Goode, which was screened on ITV in September 2020.

Goode was awarded the Queen's Police Medal in the 2012 New Year Honours for leading the investigation. After the Mahmod case, Goode continued to work to train other police officers, both nationally and internationally, to understand honour-based violence. She retired at the rank of Detective Superintendent.
