= Kassius Nelson =

English actress

- Born: 24 June 1997 (age 28); Islington, London, England
- Occupation(s): Actress, playwright
- Years active: 2012–present

Kassius Hope A. Nelson (born 24 June 1997) is an English actress and playwright. She won two British Soap Awards for her role in Hollyoaks (2015–2017) on Channel 4. She has since appeared in the Netflix series White Lines (2020) and Dead Boy Detectives (2024), and the film Pirates (2021).

== Early life ==
Nelson was born in Islington, North London. She was a performing arts student at City and Islington Sixth Form College.

== Career ==
Nelson first appeared on screen in the independent film Lone Rivers. She was 18 when she made her television debut in 2015 and began playing Jade Albright in the Channel 4 soap opera Hollyoaks. She and Richard Linnell won Best On-Screen Partnership and Scene of the Year at the 2017 British Soap Awards.

With Islington Community Theatre and the charitable Company Three theatre company, Nelson helped to put on a number of productions, including Brainstorm at the National Theatre. In 2018, Nelson wrote and co-directed Moon-stained at the Gerry's Stronger Than Fear Festival.

Nelson joined the recurring cast of the Netflix adaptation of A Series of Unfortunate Events for its third and final season as Fiona Widdershins. She then played a younger version of Angela Griffin's character Anna Connor in White Lines the following year, also on Netflix.

In 2021, Nelson made her feature film debut when she appeared in Edgar Wright's Last Night in Soho and starred in Reggie Yates' Pirates. She was cast as Crystal Palace in the DC Universe series Dead Boy Detectives, also on Netflix, taking over the role from Doom Patrol's Madalyn Horcher.

== Filmography ==
=== Film ===
Year	Title	Role	Notes
2013	Lone Rivers	Heather	
2015	Out of Body	Eimar	Short film
2019	Bush	Frida	Short film
2021	Last Night in Soho	Cami	
2021	Pirates	Sophie	
2022	Re-Live	Amy	Short film

=== Television ===
Year	Title	Role	Notes
2015–2017	Hollyoaks	Jade Albright	106 episodes
2017	Casualty	Chloe Robinson	Episode: "One"
2019	A Series of Unfortunate Events	Fiona Widdershins	3 episodes
2020	White Lines	Young Anna	9 episodes
2024	Dead Boy Detectives	Crystal Palace	8 episodes

== Stage ==
Year	Title	Role	Notes
2012	In All the Minutes Ever	Brianne	The Platform
2013	Mostly Like Blue		Rosemary Branch Theatre, London
2014	Astronauts		The Platform
2014	Housed	Haringey	Old Vic, London
2015–2016	Brainstorm	Various	Park Theatre and National Theatre
2018	Moon-stained		Writer, director Gerry's Studio

== Awards and nominations ==
Year	Award	Category	Work	Result	Ref.
2017	British Soap Awards	Best On-Screen Partnership	Hollyoaks	Won	(Note: Shared with Richard Linnell.)
2017	British Soap Awards	Scene of the Year	Hollyoaks	Won	(Note: Shared with Richard Linnell.)
2017	Inside Soap Awards	Best Exit	Hollyoaks	Nominated	
