= Polly Walker =

English actress (born 1966)

- Born: Polly Alexandra Walker; 19 May 1966 (age 60); Warrington, Lancashire, England
- Education: Drama Centre London
- Occupation: Actress
- Years active: 1988–present
- Spouse: Laurence Penry-Jones (m. 2008)
- Children: 2
- Relatives: Rupert Penry-Jones (brother-in-law)

Polly Alexandra Walker (born 19 May 1966) is an English actress. She is known to television audiences for her roles as Atia of the Julii in the historical drama series Rome (2005–07), Clarice Willow in Caprica (2009–10), Francesca Miller in Prisoners’ Wives (2012–13), Lady Featherington in Bridgerton (2020–present), and Trottie Book in Bookish (2025). She was nominated for a Golden Globe Award for Best Actress – Television Series Drama for the former.

Walker's film roles include Enchanted April (1991), Patriot Games (1992), Sliver (1993), Restoration (1995), Emma (1996), The Gambler (1997), and Savage Messiah (2002). She was nominated for a Canadian Genie Award for Best Actress for the latter.

== Early life ==
Walker was born in Warrington, Cheshire. She attended Padgate Church of England Primary School in Warrington, and Bush Davies School of Theatre Arts in East Grinstead until joining Twickenham's Rambert School of Ballet and Contemporary Dance at age 16. She had to abandon dancing after a leg injury at the age of 18, deciding to concentrate on acting.

She attended Drama Centre London, before working at the Royal Shakespeare Company.

== Career ==
=== Film and television ===
Walker landed the title role in the ITV television film Lorna Doone (1990), before making her feature debut in Journey of Honor (1991). In that same year she appeared in Les Equilibristes and in Mike Newell's Enchanted April, in which she played an aristocrat eager to escape the attentions of her persistent male admirers. Walker first gained international attention in 1992 as a single-minded English member of an Irish terrorist group in Phillip Noyce's Patriot Games.

She appeared in Douglas McGrath's 1996 adaptation of Jane Austen's Emma, as Jane Fairfax, the titular character's rival.

In 2003 she had a starring role in the BBC drama series State of Play.

Between 2005 and 2007, Walker played Atia of the Julii in both seasons of the HBO–BBC2 television series Rome. Her performance earned her a Golden Globe nomination in 2006 for Best Performance by an Actress in a Television Series – Drama.

She next played the sinister Catherine Braithwaite in "Deus Ex Machina", a two-episode story of the BBC television "cold case" crime series Waking the Dead (2007). In May 2007, she appeared as Lady Bess Sedgwick in ITV's Marple: At Bertram's Hotel, and then played sugar heiress Ellis Samuels in the CBS television drama Cane (2007).

In May 2008, Walker was cast as Sister Clarice Willow, headmistress of a private religious school, in Syfy's Battlestar Galactica prequel series Caprica. She appeared in Louis Leterrier's 2010 action fantasy remake, Clash of the Titans as Cassiopeia.

In 2011 she guest starred as Ranna Seneschal, leader of the underground city of Praxis, in the Canadian sci-fy fantasy show Sanctuary.

Walker starred in BBC's crime drama Prisoners' Wives as crime wife Francesca Miller from 2012 to 2013. She went on to appear in Andrew Staunton's 2012 science fiction action-adventure film John Carter as Sarkoja, a merciless Thark.

In 2014, she had a recurring role as the character Delphine Day in the ITV series Mr Selfridge.

In 2018, Walker starred as Bel, the leading character in Age Before Beauty. From 2019 to 2022, she portrayed dominatrix Margaret "Peggy" Skyes in the action crime drama show Pennyworth.

In 2020, she appeared as Lady Lunete, the Queen Regent and mother to Uther Pendragon, a recurring character for 5 episodes in the Netflix series, Cursed. Since December 2020, Walker has starred in the Netflix series Bridgerton as Portia, Lady Featherington. She earned a Screen Actors Guild Award nomination in 2021 with the series cast for Outstanding Performance by an Ensemble in a Drama Series.

In 2025, Walker appeared as Trottie Book in the crime drama Bookish; the series was renewed for a second season ahead of its debut, with Walker confirmed to return.

== Personal life ==
On 23 October 2008, Walker married the former actor Laurence Penry-Jones (brother of Rupert Penry-Jones) with whom she lived in the United States for several years. In 2015, they returned to London.

== Filmography ==
=== Film ===
| Year | Title | Role | Notes |
|---|---|---|---|
| 1991 | Journey of Honour | Cecilia | Original title: "Kabuto", also known as "Shogun Mayeda" |
| 1991 | Ao Fim da Noite | | |
| 1991 | Walking a Tightrope | Hélène Lagache | |
| 1992 | Enchanted April | Caroline Dester | |
| 1992 | Patriot Games | Annette | |
| 1993 | The Trial | Leni | |
| 1993 | Sliver | Vida Warren | |
| 1995 | Restoration | Celia Clemence | |
| 1996 | Emma | Jane Fairfax | |
| 1997 | Roseanna's Grave | Cecilia | |
| 1997 | Robinson Crusoe | Mary McGregor | |
| 1997 | The Gambler | Polina | |
| 1997 | Bastard | Mara | |
| 1998 | Curtain Call | Julia | |
| 1998 | Talk of Angels | Mary Lavelle | |
| 1998 | Dark Harbor | Alexis Chandler Weinberg | |
| 1999 | 8½ Women | Palmira | |
| 2000 | After Alice | Vera Swann | |
| 2002 | D-Tox | Jenny Munroe | |
| 2002 | Savage Messiah | Paula Jackson | |
| 2004 | Control | Barbara Copeland | |
| 2006 | Scenes of a Sexual Nature | Esther | |
| 2010 | Clash of the Titans | Cassiopeia | |
| 2012 | John Carter | Sarkoja | |

=== Television ===
| Year | Title | Role | Notes |
|---|---|---|---|
| 1989 | Storyboard | Margaret Niner | Episode: "Hunted Down" |
| 1989 | Rules of Engagement | Fiona | mini-series, 2 episodes |
| 1990 | Agatha Christie's Poirot | Magdala (Nick) Buckley | Episode: "Peril at End House" |
| 1990 | Screen Two | Nadja | Episode: "The Kremlin, Farewell" |
| 1990 | Lorna Doone | Lorna Doone | TV film |
| 1992 | A Dangerous Man: Lawrence After Arabia | Mme Dumont | TV film |
| 1992 | The Secret World of Spying | Annette | TV film |
| 1997 | The Woodlanders | Mrs Charmond | TV film |
| 2002 | Jeffrey Archer: The Truth | Mrs Archer | TV film |
| 2003 | The Mayor of Casterbridge | Lucetta Templeman | |
| 2003 | State of Play | Anne Collins | 6 episodes |
| 2005–07 | Rome | Atia of the Julii | 22 episodes |
| 2007 | Waking the Dead | Catherine Braithwaite | 2 episodes: "Deus Ex Machina" |
| 2007 | Agatha Christie's Marple | Bess Sedgwick | Episode: "At Bertram's Hotel" |
| 2007 | Cane | Ellis Samuels | 13 episodes |
| 2009 | Numbers | Lorna Ludlow | Episode: "Animal Rites" |
| 2009–10 | Caprica | Clarice Willow | 17 episodes |
| 2010 | Sanctuary | Ranna Seneschal | 2 episodes |
| 2011 | Psych | Randa Tabet | Episode: "Shawn Rescues Darth Vader" |
| 2012–13 | Prisoners' Wives | Francesca Miller | 10 episodes |
| 2012 | The Mentalist | FBI Agent Alexa Shultz | 2 episodes |
| 2013 | Warehouse 13 | Charlotte Dupres | 4 episodes |
| 2014 | Mr Selfridge | Delphine Day | 9 episodes |
| 2015 | The Syndicate | DI Lynn Baker | 6 episodes |
| 2016 | Paranoid | Monica Wayfield | 5 episodes |
| 2016; 2019 | Line of Duty | Gill Biggeloe | Series 3 and 5 |
| 2018 | Age Before Beauty | Bel Finch | 6 episodes |
| 201922 | Pennyworth | Margaret "Peggy" Sykes | 17 episodes |
| 2020 | Cursed | Lady Lunete | 5 episodes |
| 2020–present | Bridgerton | Portia, Lady Featherington | Series regular |
| 2024 | Dune: Prophecy | Sonya Harkonnen | Guest Star; Episode 3 |
| 2025 | Bookish | Trottie Book | Series Regular |

=== Audio dramas ===
| Year | Title | Role | Notes | Ref. |
|---|---|---|---|---|
| 2017 | Doctor Who: The Fourth Doctor Adventures | Commander Narnia | Episode: "The Movellan Grave" | |

=== Video games ===
| Year | Title | Role | Notes |
|---|---|---|---|
| 2010 | Dark Void | Ava, Survivors (voices) | |

== Stage credits ==
| Year | Title | Role | Director | Venue | Notes | Ref. |
|---|---|---|---|---|---|---|
| 1988–89 | Hamlet | Second Grave Digger | Ron Daniels | —N/a | Royal Shakespeare Company Tour | |
| 1989 | As You Like It | Phoebe | Tim Albery | The Old Vic | | |
| 1989 | Hess is Dead | Charity Luber | Danny Boyle | Almeida Theatre | Royal Shakespeare Company | |
| 2001 | Finding the Sun | Cordelia | Anthony Page | Royal National Theatre | | |
| 2003 | Les Liaisons Dangereuses | La Marquise De Merteuil | Tim Fywell | Playhouse Theatre | Ambassador Theatre Group | |

== Awards and nominations ==
| Year | Award | Category | Work | Result | Ref. |
|---|---|---|---|---|---|
| 2003 | Genie Awards | Best Performance by an Actress in a Leading Role | Savage Messiah | Nominated | |
| 2005 | Satellite Awards | Outstanding Actress in a Supporting Role in a Series, Miniseries, or Motion Picture made for Television | Rome | Nominated | |
| 2005 | Online Film & Television Association | Best Supporting Actress in a Drama Series | Rome | Won | |
| 2006 | Golden Globe Awards | Best Performance by an Actress in a Television Series - Drama | Rome | Nominated | |
| 2021 | Screen Actors Guild Awards | Outstanding Performance by an Ensemble in a Drama Series | Bridgerton | Nominated | |
