= Murder of Banaz Mahmod =

Honour killing of an Iraqi Kurdish woman in London in 2006

Banaz Mahmod
- Born: 16 December 1985; Iraqi Kurdistan, Iraq
- Died: 24 January 2006 (aged 20); London, England
- Cause of death: Murder by ligature strangulation
- Body discovered: 28 April 2006; Handsworth, Birmingham, England
- Resting place: Merton & Sutton Joint Cemetery, Morden, London, England
- Known for: Honour killing victim

Banaz Mahmod (Kurdish: بەناز مەحمود, 16 December 1985 – 24 January 2006) was a 20-year-old Iraqi Kurdish woman who lived in Mitcham, South London, England. She was murdered on the orders of her family in a so-called honour killing because she ended a violent and abusive forced marriage and started a relationship with someone of her own choosing. Her father, uncle and three cousins were later convicted of her murder.

== Background ==
=== Family ===
The Mahmods were a strictly traditional Iraqi Kurdish family from the rural Mirawdale tribal area of Qaladiza in Iraqi Kurdistan. Mahmod Babakir Mahmod and his wife Behya had a son and five daughters.

The family sought asylum in the United Kingdom in 1995 when Banaz was ten years old. Mahmod was the eldest of four brothers living in the south London area; although he was the eldest, the role of head of the family was taken by his younger brother, Ari Agha Mahmod.

Banaz's eldest sister had an arranged marriage as did her younger sister Payman (also known as Payzee), who was married at the age of 16 to a man fifteen years her senior. Bekhal, two years older than Banaz, fled the family home in 2002 and spent time in foster care. The eldest four daughters, including Banaz, had been subjected to female genital mutilation. Bekhal reported that she had been subjected to physical abuse and threats because she mixed with people her family did not approve of and experimented with Western clothing and hairstyles. She reported that an attempt was made to kill her and that her father threatened to kill her mother, sisters and himself if she did not return to the family home. Instead of returning home, Bekhal lived in hiding, constantly moving and never leaving the house without wearing a full veil. Mahmod Babakir Mahmod's failure to control Bekhal was viewed as weakness within the Kurdish community, and he was subjected to a degree of ostracism as a result.

=== Timeline ===
At age 16/17, Banaz was forced into an arranged marriage with a man from the family's Kurdish native hometown of Qaladiza. By her account he was 10 years her senior, illiterate and old-fashioned; she described his mindset as something from "fifty years prior". She came into contact with police throughout her marriage, reporting that she had been raped and beaten on multiple occasions. Her family were aware of the violence inflicted upon her, but told her that leaving her husband would bring shame on them. Despite this, and with the abuse continuing, she eventually left after two years of marriage; she returned to the family home in July 2005 and started a relationship with someone of her own choosing by the name of Rahmat Sulemani.

Both Banaz's uncle, Ari Agha Mahmod, and father Mahmod disapproved of her actions and had been informed that Banaz and Sulemani had remained in a relationship despite their claims to the contrary. On 2 December 2005, a meeting was held at the home of Ari Agha Mahmod where it was agreed that both should be killed for bringing shame onto the family and the community.

Fearing for her safety, Banaz went to the police to report that her uncle had threatened to kill both her and her boyfriend, apparently learning of the plot after overhearing a phone call between her uncle and mother on 2 December. On 12 December, she delivered a letter to Wimbledon Police Station naming those she claimed were ready to kill her.

On New Year's Eve, the police were called to a café in Wimbledon where Banaz had arrived in a distressed state saying that her father had tried to kill her. She was under the influence of alcohol, which her father had made her drink, and had injuries to her hands, having smashed a window during her escape. While witnesses described Banaz as distraught and terrified by café and hospital staff, the policewoman who interviewed her, PC Angela Cornes, did not believe her. She referred to her as "manipulative" and "melodramatic", and wanted to charge her with criminal damage for breaking the window. While in hospital Banaz gave an account of events to her boyfriend, which he recorded on his phone and later handed to the police.

On 22 January, an attempt was made to kidnap Sulemani. Three of the men involved were among those whom Banaz had already named to the police; both she and Sulemani separately reported the incident, and Banaz Mahmod was scheduled to return to the police station on 24 January, but she never arrived.

== Murder ==
On the morning of 24 January 2006, Banaz's parents left the family home to take their youngest daughter to school and go shopping, leaving Banaz asleep in the lounge. Mohamad Marid Hama, Mohammed Saleh Ali and Omar Hussain arrived at the property shortly thereafter; according to covert recordings made of Hama speaking with a visitor while he was on remand, the trio subjected Banaz to more than two hours of rape and torture before she was strangled with a ligature.

Banaz's body was put in a suitcase, transported to a house in Handsworth, Birmingham and buried in the garden.

== Investigation ==
On 25 January 2006, Banaz was reported missing by Sulemani, who had become concerned for her welfare after being unable to contact her. The police did not initially take the report seriously. Her parents portrayed themselves as an easy-going, tolerant family, claiming that Banaz often stayed out overnight, and insistent that she was not a missing person. Sulemani persisted, however, "harassing" the police into taking action.

Consequently, her parents and uncle were interviewed and their homes searched. The interviews exposed inconsistencies in the account originally given by her parents and analysis of Sulemani's phone records indicated that Banaz's father was not the indulgent parent he claimed to be. Cross-checking against the numerous contacts Banaz had already had with the police enabled them to compile a list of persons of interest.

The investigation was taken over by the Metropolitan Police Homicide and Serious Crime Command and was led by Detective Chief Inspector Caroline Goode. Initially working on the assumption that Banaz was alive and being held against her will, a search and arrest operation was conducted. Simultaneous raids were carried out at properties across the country, but there was no sign of Banaz. Her phone had not been active since late on 23 January and her bank account remained untouched.

Banaz's father and uncle, along with other potential suspects, were arrested. All were uncooperative within the interviews and the detectives were met with attempts by members of the wider Kurdish community to thwart the investigation and protect those who were implicated.

Despite the community obstruction, on 4 February 2006, Mohamad Marid Hama was charged with murder. Instrumental to this decision was Sulemani's positive identification of Hama as one of those who had earlier tried to kidnap him and who had threatened to kill both him and Banaz. While in custody, Hama was covertly recorded bragging about his role, and the role of others, in the murder of Banaz and the disposal of her body. He directly implicated her uncle, Ari Agha Mahmod, and her cousins, Mohammed Saleh Ali, Omar Hussain and Dana Amin. The recordings, coupled with phone and vehicle tracking data, enabled Banaz's remains to be located. Her body was found on 28 April 2006.

On 1 May 2006, Banaz's uncle Ari Agha Mahmod was charged with murder; a few months later, in August, Banaz's father Mahmod Babakir Mahmod was also charged with murder.

=== Funeral ===
After initially claiming that Banaz' service would take place at Regent's Park Mosque, the family made their way to a mosque in Tooting. DCI Caroline Goode stated: "They had deliberately lied to us to prevent us being present [...] when we arrived [at Tooting] it was obvious that plans had not been made for a funeral [...] the family had pitched up there with no warning [...]. They went in for prayers, leaving their daughter's body [...] in a side road. There is absolutely no doubt in my mind that it was only our presence that forced the family to hold a funeral".

Banaz was laid to rest at Merton and Sutton Joint Cemetery, Morden; her family left her grave unmarked.

On 26 June 2007, a memorial service was held for Banaz at Morden Assembly Hall, following which a granite memorial headstone was placed at her gravesite. Her family did not attend either service. The purchase of the gravestone was arranged by the Iranian and Kurdish Women's Rights Organisation (IKWRO); police officers and lead prosecutor, Nazir Afzal, were among those who contributed.

=== Extradition from Iraq ===
Both Mohammed Saleh Ali and Omar Hussain fled to Iraqi Kurdistan after the murder.

In October 2007, Scotland Yard were notified that Ali was in custody in Sulaimaniya where he had killed a teenage boy in a hit-and-run incident. He was extradited in June 2009, in what was the first ever extradition from Iraq to the United Kingdom, a move described by DCI Goode as making "legal history".

Hussain had been hiding out in a remote area of Iraq shielded by his brothers, one of whom was Peshmerga and the other a member of the Asayish security services. During a dispute with one of his brothers in December 2009, he was shot in the leg and was duly arrested when he presented himself at the hospital. Hussain insisted that he was not in the United Kingdom at the time Banaz was murdered and that it was a case of mistaken identity, but UK welfare benefit records as well as photographic evidence from a previous arrest proved otherwise, and he was extradited back to England in March 2010.

== Legal proceedings ==
The first of three trials relating to the murder commenced on 5 March 2007 at the Central Criminal Court and lasted for 14 weeks.

Sulemani, and Banaz's sister Bekhal, testified for the prosecution; in the lead up to the trial both were subjected to threats and intimidation from within the Kurdish community and placed under police protection. To further protect her identity, Bekhal appeared in court dressed in an abaya and a niqāb, only removing it for the jury when giving her evidence from behind a screen.

In June 2007, Banaz' father and uncle were unanimously found guilty of murder and sentenced to life in prison, with a minimum term of 20 and 23 years respectively; Mohammad Hama pleaded guilty to murder shortly after the start of the trial and was sentenced to life, with a minimum term of 17 years.

In November 2010, Mohammed Saleh Ali and Omar Hussain were found guilty of murder and sentenced to serve at least 22 and 21 years respectively.

In December 2013, Dana Amin was found guilty and jailed for eight years for helping to dispose of Banaz's body. Amin challenged both his conviction and sentence; the appeal was dismissed in September 2014.

=== Convictions and sentences ===
	Convictions	Sentence
Mahmod Babakir Mahmod (victim's father)	Murder	Life imprisonment with minimum term of 20 years
Ari Agha Mahmod (victim's uncle)	Murder	Life imprisonment with minimum term of 23 years
Mohamad Marid Hama	Murder	Life imprisonment with minimum term of 17 years
Pshtewan Hama	Conspiracy to pervert the course of justice	Time served
Mohammed Saleh Ali (victim's cousin)	Murder, conspiracy to kidnap, threats to kill, perverting the course of justice	Life imprisonment with minimum term of 22 years
Omar Hussain (victim's cousin)	Murder, conspiracy to kidnap, threats to kill, perverting the course of justice	Life imprisonment with minimum term of 21 years
Dana Amin (victim's cousin)	Perverting the course of justice, preventing the lawful burial of a body	Eight years imprisonment [Time served]

== Aftermath ==
The Metropolitan Police team responsible for finding Banaz's body and for building a case against those involved in her murder won the Detective Investigation Award for their work; Detective Chief Inspector Caroline Goode was awarded the Queen's Police Medal for her work leading the investigation.

=== Independent Police Complaints Commission ===
The handling of Banaz's case by the Metropolitan Police and West Midlands Police leading up to her murder was investigated by the Independent Police Complaints Commission. It found that she had been "let down" and that death threats she had reported were not taken seriously. IPCC Commissioner Nicola Williams said: "Banaz Mahmod was a young woman who lost her life in terrible circumstances [...] It is clear that the police response was at best mixed [...] There were delays in investigations, poor supervision, a lack of understanding and insensitivity".

As a result of its investigation, the IPCC recommended that written warnings be issued to several police officers involved in the case and that two Metropolitan Police officers should appear before a disciplinary panel as a result of the "worst failings" found.

=== Disciplinary panel ===
The disciplinary panel, scheduled to sit on 17 November 2008, related to the incident of 31 December 2005, when Banaz said that her father had tried to kill her, but was dismissed as "manipulative" and "melodramatic" by PC Angela Cornes who responded to the call. The disciplinary panel was abandoned before it could convene as the key witness, thought to be Sulemani, declined to take part. Cornes, and her supervisory inspector, received "words of advice", the lowest disciplinary sanction; Cornes was subsequently promoted.

=== Rahmat Sulemani ===
Following Banaz's murder, Sulemani went into witness protection. Despite his family members in Iran being threatened, he testified in both murder trials and the risks he had taken by doing so were recognised by both Judge Brian Barker and the police.

Referring to him as "one of two real heroes" in the case, DCI Caroline Goode said: "Without him we wouldn't have known that Banaz was even missing.[...] He risked his life to go up against his whole community and in doing so gave up everything and everyone he knew".

Sulemani struggled to adjust to his new life and the isolative nature of witness protection, and seemingly never recovered from Banaz's murder; he died by suicide in 2016.

== In popular culture ==
Banaz's case was chronicled in the 2012 documentary film Banaz: A Love Story, directed and produced by Deeyah Khan.

In 2015 actor and rapper Riz MC released a song, entitled "Benaz", which was based on Banaz's story, in his mixtape Englistan released on St. George's Day.

A ballad was created by a 13-year-old girl, narrating the story of Banaz and published in Sisterhood.

"Love Like Blood" (2017), from the Tom Thorne crime series by author Mark Billingham was inspired by Banaz's story and is dedicated to the memory of both her and Rahmat Sulemani.

A two-part drama, Honour, chronicles the investigation into the murder of Banaz. Starring Keeley Hawes as Caroline Goode, it was screened on ITV on 28 and 29 September 2020.

== External links and further reading ==
- BBC Outlook (2013): Interview with DCI Caroline Goode & Deeyah Khan - I Tracked Down Banaz "Honour Killers"
- Fuuse Documentary. Banaz. A Love Story
- Independent Police Complaints Commission (IPCC): Executive Summary: Contact between Banaz Mahmod and the Metropolitan Police Service and West Midlands Police
- Honour-based Violence (HBV) and Honour-based Killings in Iraqi Kurdistan and in the Kurdish Diaspora in the UK (Journal of Gender Studies)
- Payzee Mahmod: "A survivor's plea to end child marriage" Banaz's sister Payzee Mahmod at TEDxLondonWomen, December 2019

== See also ==
So-called honour killings in the United Kingdom:

- Rukhsana Naz
- Shafilea Ahmed
- Rania Alayed
- The killing of Surjit Athwal was planned in the UK and done in India
- Murder of Tulay Goren
- Murder of Heshu Yones

So-called honour killings of people with Kurdish ethnic heritage:

- Pela Atroshi (Iraqi Kurdistan)
- Fadime Şahindal (Sweden)
- Hatun Sürücü (Germany)

So-called honour killings of other people with Iraqi national heritage:

- Noor Almaleki (United States)

Female Genital Mutilation
