= Nicola Williams (barrister) =

British barrister

- Occupations: Barrister, judge, ombudsman

Nicola Williams is a British barrister specialising in criminal law. Since 2009, she has been a part-time Crown Court Judge sitting on the London and South Eastern Circuit.

She was the first Service Complaints Ombudsman for the UK Armed Forces. In that role she urged the Ministry of Defence to tackle racism in the armed forces. She has highlighted concern at the delay, and the failure to meet the target of 90% of Service complaints to be resolved in a timely fashion; and the disproportionate number of women, black and ethnic minority Service personnel making complaints.

Williams was Complaints Commissioner for the Cayman Islands from 2009 to 2014. She served several years as a Commissioner at the Independent Police Complaints Commission, a board member at the Police Complaints Authority Williams was the lead Commissioner responsible for drafting IPCC guidelines on investigating allegations of discriminatory conduct by police officers and a member of the IPCC Resources and Diversity Committees.

She is a Fellow of the RSA and a former Chair of the BBC Regional Advisory Committee for London.

In 2020, Williams was appointed as the new chair for the Independent Complaints Panel of the Portman Group the social responsibility and regulatory body for alcohol in the UK.

Williams was listed as one of the 100 most influential Black people in the U.K and won a Cosmopolitan magazine Woman of Achievement Award (Professions).

She is the author of the novel Without Prejudice (2021), which describes the experiences of being a black female lawyer in Britain is also an indictment of the legal system and privilege. The novel was republished by Penguin Books in 2020 in a series curated by Bernardine Evaristo of 'lost and hard-to-find' books by Black writers.
