= Outside the Wire =

2021 American science fiction film

- Official release poster
- Directed by: Mikael Håfström
- Screenplay by: Rob Yescombe; Rowan Athale
- Story by: Rob Yescombe
- Produced by: Brian Kavanaugh-Jones; Anthony Mackie; Ben Pugh; Erica Steinberg; Jason Spire; Arash Amel
- Starring: Anthony Mackie; Damson Idris; Emily Beecham; Michael Kelly; Pilou Asbæk
- Cinematography: Michael Bonvillain
- Edited by: Rickard Krantz
- Music by: Lorne Balfe
- Production companies: Automatik Entertainment; 42 Films; Inspire Entertainment
- Distributed by: Netflix
- Release date: January 15, 2021
- Running time: 115 minutes
- Country: United States
- Language: English

Outside the Wire is a 2021 American cyberpunk action film directed by Mikael Håfström. It stars Anthony Mackie (who also produced) as an android officer who works with a drone pilot (Damson Idris) to stop a global catastrophe. Emily Beecham, Michael Kelly, and Pilou Asbæk also star. The film was released by Netflix on January 15, 2021, and received mixed reviews from critics.

== Plot ==
In 2036, a civil war between pro-Russian insurgents and a resistance movement in Ukraine leads the U.S. to deploy peacekeeping forces after a failed U.N. intervention. During an operation, a team of U.S. Marines and robotic soldiers, called "G.U.M.P."s, are ambushed. Disobeying an order, drone pilot Lt. Thomas Harp deploys a Hellfire missile in a drone strike against a suspected enemy launcher, killing two Marines caught in the kill zone but saving the lead Lieutenant and the remaining 38 Marines who would have been killed by the launcher. As punishment, Harp is redeployed to combat duty at Camp Nathaniel, the U.S. base of operations in Ukraine. Harp is assigned to Capt. Leo, a highly advanced and experimental android super-soldier masquerading as a human officer, a secret known only by Harp and camp commander Col. Eckhart.

Harp and Leo, under the cover of delivering vaccines to a refugee camp, set out on a mission to prevent terrorist Victor Koval from gaining control of a network of Cold War–era nuclear missile silos. On the way, they respond to a reported attack on a friendly aid truck, resulting in a stand-off between the Marines and armed locals. After a G.U.M.P. shoots a local who threw a rock, Leo negotiates a peaceful solution by giving the locals the contents of the aid truck. However, pro-Russian insurgents ambush the locals and Marines, leading to a firefight. This forces Leo and Harp to travel to the refugee camp on foot, while the Marines remain behind to engage the insurgents.

At the refugee compound, Leo and Harp are shot at by an insurgent, who kills some civilians. Leo tortures the insurgent for information, before leaving him to be killed by the gathered mob. Leo and Harp meet their contact Sofiya, a resistance leader. Sofiya leads them to an arms dealer who knows the location of a bank vault containing nuclear launch codes that Koval is looking for. Harp and Leo travel to the bank and are met by Koval's forces, which include several Russian-built G.U.M.P.s. Harp rescues a few of the civilians caught in a crossfire between U.S. and Russian G.U.M.P.s, while Leo retrieves the codes but cannot find Koval. A drone strike called in by Eckhart destroys the bank and several buildings, leading the military command to believe Koval dead and Leo destroyed.

Leo reunites with Harp, and tells him that he has his own plans for the codes, and has been manipulating Harp into helping him evade the eye of military command. He knocks out Harp and leaves him on the side of the road where he is picked up by Sofiya's men. Leo meets with Koval to give him the codes but kills him when Koval refuses to give Leo access to a nuclear missile silo, hidden in a Russian decommissioned nuclear power plant. Harp informs Sofiya and Eckhart of Leo's actions, and they realize that Leo is planning to launch the nuclear missiles to strike the United States, in order to prevent them from fighting more wars in the future. Harp volunteers to infiltrate the silo and finds Leo has taken over. He disables Leo but not before Leo initiates the launch of four missiles, explaining that his goal was for the android super-soldier program to end in failure, averting never-ending war associated with "remove the humanity, increase the fight". Harp escapes as the silo is destroyed by a drone strike before the missiles can launch, destroying Leo in the process and saving the United States. Harp receives praise from Eckhart, who informs him that he will be returning to the States.

== Cast ==
- Anthony Mackie as Leo
- Damson Idris as Thomas Harp
- Enzo Cilenti as Miller
- Emily Beecham as Sofiya
- Henry Garrett as Brydon
- Kristina Tonteri-Young as Bale
- Pilou Asbæk as Victor Koval
- Michael Kelly as Eckhart

== Production ==
The film was announced in June 2019, with Anthony Mackie set to star and produce, and Mikael Håfström to direct. Damson Idris and Emily Beecham joined the cast the following month. Michael Kelly and Pilou Asbæk signed on later. Filming began around Budapest in August 2019, lasting eight weeks.

== Release ==
Outside the Wire was released by Netflix digitally on January 15, 2021. The film was the most-watched on the platform over its debut weekend. On April 20, 2021, Netflix reported that the film was watched by 66 million households during its first quarter.

=== Critical response ===
On review aggregator Rotten Tomatoes, the film holds an approval rating of 37% based on 90 reviews, with an average rating of 4.9/10. The website's critics consensus reads, "A serviceable sci-fi diversion, Outside the Wire packs enough action to keep viewers watching – even if they aren't likely to remember much later." According to Metacritic, which calculated a weighted average score of 45 out of 100 based on 15 critics, the film received "mixed or average reviews".

David Ehrlich of IndieWire gave the film a grade of C and wrote that "...the result of [the screenwriters'] efforts is a high-concept slab of 'Netflix movie of the week' sci-fi that wrestles with some big questions about the future of modern warfare via a conceit that borders dangerously close to Chappie."
