= Dolly Alderton =

British journalist, author and screenwriter (born 1988)

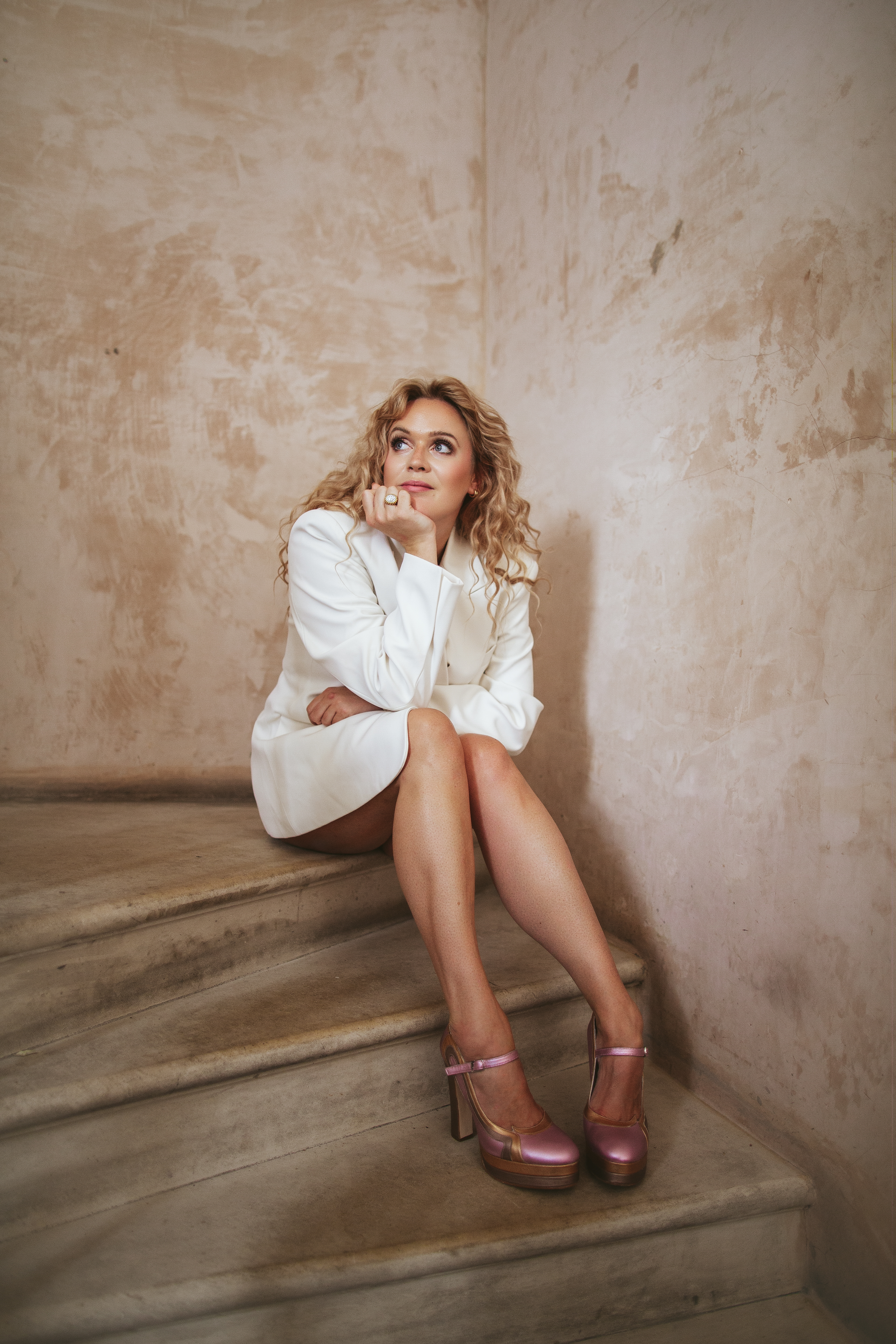
- Alderton in 2024
- Born: Hannah Alderton; 31 August 1988 (age 38); London, England
- Education: University of Exeter; (BA) City University; (MA)
- Occupations: Author and screenwriter
- Writing career
- Notable works: Everything I Know About Love (2018); Ghosts (2020); Good Material (2023)
- Website: dollyalderton.com

Dolly Alderton (born 31 August 1988) is a British author and screenwriter. She is also a columnist for The Sunday Times. Her memoir Everything I Know About Love won a 2018 National Book Award for autobiography and was shortlisted for the 2019 Non-Fiction Narrative Book of the Year in the British Book Awards, and adapted into a BBC/Peacock eponymous television drama series. She also wrote the upcoming 2026 TV adaption of Pride and Prejudice.

== Early life ==
Alderton was born in London and grew up in Stanmore, England. She was born to British and Canadian parents, and describes herself as "half Canadian". Born Hannah Alderton, she changed her name to Dolly in her teens. She was educated at St Margaret's School in Bushey, and Rugby School, where she boarded in the sixth form. She earned a bachelor's degree in drama and English from the University of Exeter, and a master's degree in journalism from City University in London.

== Career ==
Alderton is an author, journalist, and podcast host.

=== Journalism ===
Alderton began writing for The Sunday Times in 2015, working initially as a dating columnist from 2015 to 2017. In 2020, she began working as an agony aunt for The Sunday Times in her column Dear Dolly.

=== Books ===
Alderton's debut book, Everything I Know About Love, was published in February 2018. BBC News described it as "offering readers a frank and deeply personal account of friendships, relationships and growing up as a millennial". The memoir was shortlisted for the National Book Awards in 2018 in the autobiography category (won that year by Michelle Obama for Becoming). It was shortlisted for the 2018 Waterstones Book of the Year. In October 2020, Alderton was working on a TV adaptation of Everything I Know About Love. It was produced by Working Title Television and Universal International Studios for BBC, with a screenplay by Alderton, directed by China Moo-Young.

Her first novel, Ghosts, was published in October 2020 by Fig Tree. The novel concerns a 32-year-old food writer, Nina, who meets someone through a dating app, while her father is beginning to show signs of dementia. In October 2020, it was reported that Alderton had sold the film rights to Ghosts.

In October 2022, Alderton released a third book entitled Dear Dolly, a collection of her Sunday Times columns and a new personal essay. Alderton's second novel, Good Material, was released in November 2023. In 2024 Alderton was nominated for and shortlisted for the Bollinger Everyman Wodehouse Prize for her novel Good Material.

=== Podcasts ===
Alderton co-created and co-hosted The High Low with Pandora Sykes. The High Low was a weekly podcast focusing on pop culture and current affairs. The podcast ran for four years and more than 150 episodes were recorded. The final episode aired on 2 December 2020. The High Low: A Christmas Special Live Stream took place on 8 December 2020 to raise funds for Blood Cancer UK.

Alderton presented the podcast Love Stories in conjunction with her book Everything I Know About Love, where she interviewed a number of guests including Stanley Tucci, Ruth Jones and Marian Keyes. Season one was released between February 2018 and May 2018, and season two between January 2019 and March 2019. In January 2019, Penguin published a feature titled Six inspiring lessons I learnt from Love Stories, where Alderton described the experience as a "great privilege".

Alderton has been a guest on numerous podcasts, including Off Menu with Ed Gamble and James Acaster, How to Fail with Elizabeth Day, and Table Manners with Jessie Ware. She was the very first guest on Margaret Cabourn-Smith's podcast Crushed by Margaret Cabourn-Smith. From February to April 2021, Alderton co-hosted a spin-off series for the Sentimental Garbage podcast titled Sentimental in the City with Caroline O'Donoghue. In March 2021, the podcast received a five-star review in The Times.

=== Themes ===
Alderton's work explores themes of love, female friendship, and her experiences living as a millennial woman. Naomi Gordon described Alderton's memoir Everything I Know about Love as "self-deprecating, and occasionally heartbreaking[,] musings on love, friendship, relationships, and growing up as millennial".

=== Film, TV and radio ===
From 2011, Alderton worked as a story producer for series 2-5 of the BAFTA-winning Made in Chelsea, made by Monkey Kingdom. Alderton has written and directed two independent films with her writing partner Lauren Bensted. Alderton released The Confluence, a documentary about Tagg's Island in 2014, and Anna, Island, a short film accepted to the London Short Film Festival, in 2015. Alderton worked as a script assistant on the final series of Channel 4's Fresh Meat and directed the behind-the-scenes online videos for the last series of Fresh Meat and the last series of Channel 4's Peep Show. Alderton also had a script for a comedy drama TV series with Tiger Aspect in development.

She adapted her book Everything I Know About Love into a romantic comedy with Working Title TV. In May 2021, Alderton announced that the adaptation had been commissioned by the BBC and later by Peacock in the U.S. The BBC synopsis describes the romantic comedy as a portrayal of two best friends, Maggie and Birdy, as they "finally land in London to live it large, when the unexpected happens – dependable Birdy gets a steady boyfriend". It has been described as a "generous, funny, warm-hearted and uplifting Sex & The City for millennials which covers bad dates and squalid flat-shares, heartaches and humiliations, and, most importantly, unbreakable female friendships". The drama premiered on BBC One in June 2022 and stars Emma Appleton, Bel Powley, Marli Siu and Aliyah Odoffin. All episodes are available to stream on BBC iPlayer. In the same month, it was announced that NBCUniversal's Peacock picked the series as well for streaming in the U.S. to add to its original programming catalogue lineup for the summer season, and it premiered on 25 August 2022. In 2020, she appeared on BBC Radio 4's Great Lives, nominating actress Doris Day.

Alderton wrote the forthcoming Pride and Prejudice miniseries for Netflix, which was first announced in October 2024. The adaptation was described as being "progressive" in outlook. She said in a press release, "Jane Austen's Pride and Prejudice is the blueprint for romantic comedy—it has been a joy to delve back into its pages to find both familiar and fresh ways of bringing this beloved book to life. The book is a gift to adapt—packed with drama and depth as well as comedy and charm. In it lies the opportunity to examine the complexities of love, family, friendship, and society, while aspiring to Austen's delightfully observational voice. With Euros Lyn directing our stellar cast, I am so excited to reintroduce these hilarious and complicated characters to those who count Pride and Prejudice as their favorite book, and those who are yet to meet their Lizzie and Mr Darcy." Alderton will also executive produce the series. The series is stated to release in fall of 2026.

== Recognition ==
Alderton appeared in a Forbes 30 Under 30 List in 2018. In 2019, she was a judge for the Women's Prize for Fiction. In 2022, she was awarded an honorary doctorate by the University of Exeter.

== Personal life ==
Food is one of Alderton's principal interests; she has named spaghetti vongole as her preferred last meal, and is passionate about pickling and vinegar.

== Books ==
=== Fiction ===
- Ghosts. Fig Tree. 15 October 2020. ISBN 978-0241434543.
- Good Material. Fig Tree. 7 November 2023. ISBN 978-0241523667.

=== Nonfiction ===
- Everything I Know About Love. Penguin Books. 1 February 2018. ISBN 978-0241982105. (Reissued with a new chapter on "everything I know at thirty")
- Dear Dolly. Penguin Books. 27 October 2023. ISBN 978-0241623640.

== Filmography ==
Key
†	Denotes films that have not yet been released

Year	Title	Director	Writer	Producer	Notes	Ref.
2011-2013	Made in Chelsea	No	No	Yes	Series 2-5; story producer	
2014	The Confluence	Yes	—N/a	No	Documentary short film; together with Lauren Bensted	
2015	Anna, Island	Yes	Yes	No	Short film; together with Lauren Bensted	
2016	Fresh Meat	No	No	No	Series 4; script assistant	
2021	Everything I Know About Love	No	Yes	Yes	Creator and writer; adapted from her novel	
2026	Pride and Prejudice †	No	Yes	Yes	Miniseries	
