= Everything I Know About Love =

2018 memoir by Dolly Alderton

- Author: Dolly Alderton
- Language: English
- Subjects: Human sexuality; Dating
- Genre: Memoir
- Publisher: Penguin
- Publication date: 2018
- Publication place: United Kingdom
- ISBN: 9780241982105

Everything I Know About Love is a 2018 memoir by the British journalist Dolly Alderton, in which the author recounts the adventures of a woman navigating her 20s.

== Story ==
The book spans from Alderton's experience in primary and secondary school in the United Kingdom to living in "the real world" in her late 20s with her friends. Anecdotes in the memoir pertain to Alderton's experiences throughout higher education (University of Exeter), trysts with her friends and roommates, toxic relationships with men and her body, and dealing with the loss of someone close to her.

The back cover of the paperback describes the memoir as "wildly funny, occasionally heartbreaking, internationally bestselling": informing readers about growing up and navigating friendships, career changes, grief, and finding lasting love. Although the memoir has a wide audience, positive reviews are most often affiliated with young women, the largest percentage of Alderton's fanbase. The memoir includes personal anecdotes, text conversations, and recipes alongside a narrative writing style.

This autobiographical memoir is the first of Alderton's published books, followed by Ghosts, Dear Dolly, and Good Material —— all New York Times bestsellers. Good Material and Ghosts are contemporary novels also pertaining to men and women in their twenties, whereas Dear Dolly is a collection of Alderton's responses from her "agony aunt" column with The Sunday Times.

== Reception ==
Everything I Know About Love was nominated for Waterstones Book of the Year in 2018, earned a 2018 National Book Award for autobiography, was shortlisted for the 2019 Non-Fiction Narrative Book of the Year in the British Book Awards, and adapted into a BBC/Peacock eponymous television drama series. The book has been translated into over 25 languages including Polish and Russian.

Dolly Alderton has always been a sparkling Roman candle of talent. She is funny, smart, and explosively engaged in the wonders and weirdness of the world. But what makes this memoir more than mere entertainment is the mature and sophisticated evolution that Alderton describes in these pages. It’s a beautifully told journey and a thoughtful, important book. I loved it.

— Elizabeth Gilbert, New York Times bestselling author of Eat, Pray, Love
