= Mirawdale (tribe) =

Kurdish tribe in Iraq

Mirawdali (alternatively Mirawdale, Mirawdeli, Mirawdaly, میراودەلی, Agha, Pizhdar or Pishdar) is a Kurdish tribe in Iraqi Kurdistan. The tribe is estimated to have more than 15,000 families, and is mainly located in the Pshdar area in the Kurdistan region of Iraq, while some are located near the Iranian town of Sardasht.

== History ==
In the early 1990s, the tribe was in conflict with other tribes in the region. This conflict was instigated by government so it could divide and conquer the area and the tribe lost control of the majority of Pshdar.. Government intervention in the conflict, prompted influential Mirawdali members to flee to the border of Iran.

Since the late 1990s, some of Mirawdali members have sought refuge from Iraqi Kurdistan, due to the political and financial situation in the area. They are now mostly settled in Europe, the United States and Canada.

== Demographics ==
Due to the political and financial situation in Iraqi Kurdistan, some members of the tribe fled the country. They were mainly in their early 20s, which left a lasting impact on the financial situation, seeing as they settled into the countries they fled to. A large proportion of Mirawdali people reside in Qaladiza.
