= List of mass shootings in Germany =

This is a list of known mass shootings that have occurred in Germany. Mass shootings are firearm-related incidents with at least four casualties. As of June 2026, 638 people have died and 522 people have been injured in 194 mass shootings, with a total of 1,160 casualties (including perpetrator/s).

== 21st century ==
=== 2020s ===
Date	Location	Dead	Injured	Total	Description
29 June 2026	Stade, Lower Saxony	6	0	6	2026 Stade shooting: A man opened fire at a youth welfare center over a child custody dispute, killing six employees of the facility.
20 February 2026	Strullendorf, Bavaria	4 (Note: Including the perpetrator)	0	4	A man shot and killed his wife and two children before killing himself.
25 January 2026	Berlin	0	4	4	Four people were wounded during a family dispute in an apartment in Tiergarten.
25 November 2025	Reutlingen district, Baden-Württemberg	5	0	5	A man shot and killed his sister in her apartment, then went to his St. Johann business and killed his two children. He then went to his home in Pfullingen and killed his partner and himself.
30 September 2025	Oldenburg, Lower Saxony	4	0	4	A man killed his ex-partner, her two children, and himself in an apartment.
11 April 2025	Klettbach, Thuringia	4	0	4	A police officer killed his wife, two children, and himself with his service weapon.
26 February 2025	Bielefeld, North Rhine-Westphalia	0	4	4	Several shots were fired at the regional court of Bielefeld during the Besar Nimani murder trial. Some of the gunfire was directed from a passing car. At least four people were injured, including the father and brother of the defendant. Two suspects were arrested at the scene. Nimani's sister was held on suspicion of attempted murder.
14 July 2024	Albstadt, Baden-Württemberg	3	2	5	A man shot four family members at their house, killing two of them, before killing himself in the garden.
1 June 2024	Hagen, North Rhine-Westphalia	0	4	4	A man shot and wounded his wife at their apartment, then drove to a hair salon and injured three people. He was arrested on 2 June south of Hagen.
1 March 2024	Rotenburg an der Wümme, Lower Saxony	4	2	6	A Bundeswehr soldier shot and killed four people, including a 3-year-old girl, at a house. He then wounded two people at another house before being arrested.
25 January 2024	Montabaur, Rhineland-Palatinate	4	0	4	A man shot and killed his wife, his father, and his son before fatally shooting himself at their home.
28 July 2023	Langweid am Lech, Bavaria	3	2	5	Three people were killed and two others were wounded at two residences. A man was arrested.
9 March 2023	Hamburg	8	8	16	2023 Hamburg shooting: Six people and an unborn child were killed, and eight others were injured, during a shooting at a Kingdom Hall of Jehovah's Witnesses in Groß Borstel. The gunman then killed himself.
4 May 2022	Duisburg, North Rhine-Westphalia	0	4	4	Four people were injured during a fight between Hells Angels and a group of Turks. Fifteen people were taken into custody.
18 April 2022	Chemnitz, Saxony	4	0	4	A man shot and killed his partner and another couple residing in the same building before killing himself.
24 January 2022	Heidelberg, Baden-Württemberg	2	3	5	Heidelberg University shooting: A Heidelberg University student killed one person and wounded three others in a lecture hall before fleeing and committing suicide nearby.
26 December 2021	Glinde, Schleswig-Holstein	3	1	4	A man shot and killed his two children and wounded his wife before killing himself.
4 December 2021	Königs Wusterhausen, Brandenburg	5	0	5	A man shot and killed his wife and three children before killing himself. He committed the murders after falsifying a vaccination certificate and feared that his children would be removed from his care due to the deception.
25 September 2021	Mannheim, Baden-Württemberg	0	6	6	Six people were wounded in a shootout outside a restaurant.
20 June 2021	Berlin	0	4	4	Three men and a woman were wounded in a drive-by shooting in Wedding.
26 December 2020	Berlin	0	4	4	A criminal opened fire on other criminals after a dispute in Kreuzberg, wounding three. One of the injured fired back and wounded the shooter, who attempted to escape by jumping into the Landwehr Canal, but was pulled out by rescue workers and arrested.
19 February 2020	Hanau, Hesse	12	4	16	Hanau shootings: A far-right extremist opened fire at multiple shisha bars catering to immigrants, killing nine people and wounding five others. The shooter returned to his home, where he killed his mother before committing suicide. One of the wounded died of his injuries in 2026.
14 February 2020	Berlin	1	4	5	One man was killed and four others wounded in a shooting outside an event hall in Kreuzberg.
24 January 2020	Rot am See, Baden-Württemberg	6	2	8	Rot am See shooting: A man killed six people and wounded two others in a domestic dispute. He was arrested at the scene.

=== 2010s ===
Date	Location	Dead	Injured	Total	Description
9 October 2019	Halle, Saxony-Anhalt	2	3	5	Halle synagogue shooting: A neo-Nazi live-streamed his attempt to enter a synagogue; when he failed, he opened fire on random people, killing two people and wounding two others before being wounded and arrested.
19 May 2018	Saarbrücken, Saarland	2	2	4	A man opened fire at a party, killing two people and wounding two others.
16 September 2017	Traunreut, Bavaria	2	2	4	A man killed two people and injured two others at a bar.
16 September 2017	Berlin	1	3	4	A gunman killed one and injured three others outside of a nightclub in Neu-Hohenschönhausen.
30 July 2017	Konstanz, Baden-Württemberg	2	4	6	2017 Konstanz shooting: A man killed one person and injured four others, including a police officer, at a nightclub before dying in a shootout with the police.
13 June 2017	Munich, Bavaria	0	4	4	A man stole a policewoman's service pistol at a metro station and opened fire, wounding her and two bystanders before being shot himself.
19 October 2016	Georgensgmünd, Bavaria	1	4	5	A man opened fire on police officers carrying out a raid on his apartment, killing one and injuring four.
22 July 2016	Munich, Bavaria	10	4	14	2016 Munich shooting: A man opened fire at a shopping mall, killing nine people and wounding four others before killing himself.
25 June 2016	Leipzig, Saxony	1	3	4	One person was killed and three others were seriously injured during a shootout between rival motorcycle gangs.
21 December 2015	Bayreuth, Bavaria	3	1	4	A hunter killed his ex-girlfriend and her father and wounded the ex-girlfriend's friend before committing suicide.
19 November 2015	Cologne, North Rhine-Westphalia	1	5	6	Shots fired at a bar in Nippes killed one person and wounded five others.
26 November 2014	Hamm, North Rhine-Westphalia	2	3	5	A resident shot and killed one person and wounded three others at a senior living center before killing himself.
3 July 2014	Frankfurt, Hesse	0	5	5	Five people were shot in a dispute between motorcycle gangs in Bahnhofsviertel.
21 March 2014	near Günzach, Bavaria	1	3	4	One person was killed and three others wounded (including two police officers) in a shootout aboard a train.
24 August 2013	Bielefeld, North Rhine-Westphalia	0	4	4	Four assailant attacked a man outside a cafe; the man pulled out a gun and shot and wounded the four men before fleeing. He was arrested later.
20 August 2013	Dossenheim, Baden-Württemberg	3	5	8	Dossenheim shooting: A man killed two people and wounded five others during a dispute before committing suicide.
24 July 2013	Salzgitter, Lower Saxony	0	7	7	Seven people were wounded when an argument escalated into gunfire.
9 May 2013	Langerwehe/Kerpen, North Rhine-Westphalia	3	4	7	A man drove around to different homes in two villages and fired shots from a rifle, killing three family members and wounding three other people. The gunman shot himself and fell into a coma as police responded.
11 November 2012	Hilden, North Rhine-Westphalia	1	4	5	A man wounded four co-workers at a 3M factory before killing himself.
4 July 2012	Karlsruhe, Baden-Württemberg	5	0	5	Karlsruhe murders: A man killed his girlfriend before a scheduled eviction, then took four people enforcing the court order hostage. After releasing one of the hostages, he fatally shot the remaining ones before committing suicide.
5 March 2012	Weilerbach, Rhineland-Palatinate	3	2	5	A man entered a doctor's office with a gun and shot and killed two doctors and wounded an assistant. He then drove to his house, wounding a police officer during a pursuit, and killed himself.
8 November 2011	Bünde, North Rhine-Westphalia	0	4	4	A man shot and wounded four business partners during a meeting before being arrested.
6 April 2011	Hamburg	2	2	4	A man shot and wounded his girlfriend before killing her brother and wounding an intervening neighbor in an alley in Hamm. He killed himself as police arrived.
3 March 2011	Genthin, Saxony-Anhalt	4	0	4	A man shot and killed three people at a shooting range. He killed himself a day later.
2 March 2011	Frankfurt am Main, Hesse	2	2	4	2011 Frankfurt Airport shooting: An Islamic extremist killed two American airmen and wounded two others hours before the soldiers were to be deployed to Afghanistan from Frankfurt Airport. The shooter was arrested.
19 September 2010	Lörrach, Baden-Württemberg	2	2	4	2010 Lörrach hospital shooting: A woman stabbed and smothered her ex-partner and five-year-old son to death before opening fire on people outside a hospital, killing another person and wounding two others. The shooter was killed by police.

=== 2000s ===
Date	Location	Dead	Injured	Total	Description
24 October 2009	Dresden, Saxony	1	3	4	A man shot and wounded his wife and two of her relatives before killing himself.
18 August 2009	Schwalmtal, North Rhine-Westphalia	3	1	4	A man killed three people and wounded another in a house. After barricading himself inside the house, the gunman surrendered.
18 July 2009	Hamburg	0	5	5	Five people were wounded in a shootout outside a bar in Billstedt.
9 April 2009	Eislingen, Baden-Württemberg	4	0	4	Quadruple murder in Eislingen: A man and his friend killed the friend's parents and two sisters. They fled the scene, but were arrested.
7 April 2009	Landshut, Bavaria	2	2	4	A man shot three people in a courthouse, one fatally, before committing suicide.
18 March 2009	Hornsen, Lower Saxony	3	3	6	A man shot five family members, two fatally, before committing suicide.
11 March 2009	Winnenden and Wendlingen, Baden-Württemberg	16	9	25	2009 Winnenden shootings: A 17-year-old opened fire at his former school in Winnenden before killing a man outside and fleeing to Wendlingen, where he began firing randomly at a car dealership. He killed fifteen people and wounded nine others before being shot by police and committing suicide.
3 December 2008	Rheine, North Rhine-Westphalia	4	0	4	A man killed his wife and two children with several firearms before committing suicide.
12 August 2008	Rüsselsheim am Main, Hesse	3	1	4	Four shooters opened fire at an ice cream parlor, killing three people and wounding another.
21 May 2008	Hamburg	1	3	4	A man shot and wounded his wife in Billstedt, then fired at responding police officers and injured two before killing himself.
13 January 2008	Lauda-Königshofen, Baden-Württemberg	4	0	4	A man killed three family members with a carbine before committing suicide.
15 August 2007	Duisburg, North Rhine-Westphalia	6	0	6	Duisburg massacre: Six people were shot dead in their cars outside a train station. The victims were linked to the San Luca Mafia feud in Italy.
4 February 2007	Sittensen, Lower Saxony	7	0	7	Sittensen murders: Seven people were found fatally shot in a Chinese restaurant in a botched robbery. Two men were arrested and convicted for the murders.
20 November 2006	Emsdetten, North Rhine-Westphalia	1	8	9	Emsdetten school shooting: A student opened fire at his former school, wounding eight people by gunfire before killing himself. Twenty-nine people were injured when the shooter detonated smoke grenades as he roamed the building.
30 August 2006	Öhringen, Baden-Württemberg	2	2	4	A man waited for four family members outside a hospital and shot them, killing two and wounding two. He fled, but later gave his location to police and surrendered.
3 July 2006	Niederkassel, North Rhine-Westphalia	0	4	4	A dispute between ten people and employees and customers at a restaurant caused a man to shoot and wound four people before fleeing.
15 May 2006	Erftstadt, North Rhine-Westphalia	3	1	4	A man shot his wife and two sons before committing suicide. One of the sons survived.
6 January 2006	Bremen, Bremen	0	5	5	Five people were wounded outside a discotheque when multiple shooters exchanged gunfire. Four suspects were arrested.
30 October 2005	Saltendorf, Bavaria	1	8	9	A man opened fire in a bar, killing one person and wounding eight before fleeing. He surrendered to police two days later.
24 October 2005	Lohmar, North Rhine-Westphalia	4	0	4	A man invaded his ex-wife's house and killed her, her partner, and their son before committing suicide.
31 August 2005	Pforzheim, Baden-Württemberg	1	4	5	A man wounded four people in an apartment before killing himself.
26 July 2005	Stade, Lower Saxony	2	4	6	After wounding four people, a man killed his girlfriend and himself.
13 June 2005	Hamburg	2	4	6	After responding to a call for a group attempting to steal a license plate in Dulsberg, police were shot at by a man, wounding four. The gunman killed his accomplice and committed suicide.
30 April 2005	Rheinfelden, Baden-Württemberg	6	0	6	A man killed five family members and himself.
5 April 2005	Rudolstadt, Thuringia	2	2	4	A man shot two people during an argument, killing one. The shooter was killed by police when he injured an officer with his car. A stray police gunshot also injured a car passenger.
10 November 2004	Wasungen, Thuringia	3	1	4	A man shot three family members, killing two, before committing suicide.
26 July 2004	Munich, Bavaria	1	4	5	A man shot and wounded three people with a rifle at his apartment building. A man fought the perpetrator, causing the gunman to accidentally fatally shoot himself. The man left the building holding the shooter's gun and was injured by police, who confused him for the perpetrator.
14 May 2004	Floß, Bavaria	3	1	4	A man killed his wife and two children before shooting and wounding himself.
28 February 2004	Dortmund, North Rhine-Westphalia	1	4	5	A man was killed and four others were wounded in a shooting.
30 June 2003	Berlin	2	2	4	A man killed his ex-girlfriend during a domestic dispute at a restaurant in Kreuzberg. He fled the scene to his house, wounding two people at random, and committed suicide.
14 June 2003	Quierschied, Saarland	4	0	4	A man shot and killed his wife and two children before killing himself.
15 May 2003	Ludwigshafen, Rhineland-Palatinate	4	0	4	A man killed two doctors at their offices and then killed himself. The perpetrator's wife was found dead in their apartment.
6 May 2003	Herren-Sulzbach, Rhineland-Palatinate	4	1	5	A man shot his ex-wife, her lover, and the lover's parents before killing himself at another location. The lover's father was the only survivor.
21 April 2003	Wiesbaden, Hesse	2	2	4	A fight between two groups escalated into a shooting outside a discotheque. Two people were killed and two people were wounded. Two suspects were arrested.
22 March 2003	Vöhl, Hesse	4	0	4	A police officer killed three family members and himself with his service pistol.
24 June 2002	Dortmund, North Rhine-Westphalia	2	2	4	Two people were killed and two others wounded in a drive-by shooting.
23 May 2002	Lahr, Baden-Württemberg	1	4	5	A man was killed and four others were wounded outside a pub after an argument escalated.
26 April 2002	Erfurt, Thuringia	17	1	18	Erfurt school massacre: A 19-year-old entered his former school and opened fire. Targeting teachers, he killed sixteen people and wounded one before committing suicide.
19 February 2002	Eching and Freising, Bavaria	4	1	5	Eching and Freising shootings: A man opened fire at multiple locations, killing three people and wounding another before committing suicide.
26 April 2001	Neubeuern, Bavaria	2	2	4	A man entered his wife's workplace and opened fire, killing her and wounding two others before fatally shooting himself.
19 January 2001	Hamburg	1	4	5	An intoxicated man shot at a group of men he had an argument with earlier at a bar in Altona, killing one and wounding three. Another patron was struck by a stray bullet. The gunman shot at police, wounding a police dog, before being arrested.
22 December 2000	Salzgitter, Lower Saxony	6	1	7	A man shot and killed six family members with a pistol and wounded another before surrendering to police.
4 December 2000	Frankfurt, Hesse	3	1	4	Four men inside a bar in Sachsenhausen were lured into the street by a man. When they exited the bar, they were shot at, leaving three dead and one wounded.
31 August 2000	Hamburg	3	2	5	A man intruded into his ex-girlfriend's home in Wilhelmsburg and waited for her and her three daughters to arrive. He shot his ex-girlfriend and two of the daughters to death, then fled the scene into another apartment, where he and a hostage were shot and wounded during a standoff with police.
9 August 2000	Helmstedt, Lower Saxony	0	4	4	A shootout between family members at a campsite left four people wounded.
25 June 2000	near Nordhorn, Lower Saxony	3	1	4	A man shot and killed two of his children and wounded another before killing himself.
14 June 2000	Dortmund/Waltrop, North Rhine-Westphalia	4	0	4	A man shot three police officers dead during a chase before committing suicide at another location.
31 May 2000	Westerholt, Lower Saxony	2	3	5	A doctor opened fire in front of a supermarket, killing two people and wounding three others.
27 February 2000	Hamburg	2	3	5	A man shot five people, two fatally, outside a discotheque in Wandsbek. The discotheque was known to police as a scene of criminal activity.
January 2000	Wolfenbüttel, Lower Saxony	4	0	4	A Hamburg man shot and killed a woman, her partner, and their five-month-old son in an apartment before killing himself. Their bodies were discovered two weeks later on 9 February.

== 20th century ==
=== 1990s ===
Date	Location	Dead	Injured	Total	Description
9 November 1999	Bielefeld, North Rhine-Westphalia	8	1	9	1999 Bielefeld shooting: A man shot and killed seven members of a family. He committed suicide several hours later during a manhunt.
1 November 1999	Bad Reichenhall, Bavaria	5	7	12	Bad Reichenhall shooting: A 16-year-old killed his sister, then used a semi-automatic rifle to kill three people and wound seven others as he fired from his window. The shooter killed himself.
30 June 1999	Frankfurt, Hesse	0	6	6	Police officers exchanged gunfire with three perpetrators during a vehicle check in Innenstadt, leaving four officers and two perpetrators wounded.
23 June 1999	Neunkirchen, Saarland	4	0	4	A man shot and killed his wife and three children at two locations. He was discovered dead in the Rhine.
16 May 1999	Dillingen, Saarland	6	11	17	Dillingen shooting: A man opened fire in a discotheque, killing two people and wounding three others. He fled to a nearby house, where he killed two people and wounded another. The gunman killed another person and wounded two in France before committing suicide in Luxembourg.
17 February 1999	Berlin	3	16	19	Berlin Israeli consulate attack: Claiming self-defense, security officers at the Embassy of Israel opened fire on Kurdish protesters as they attacked the embassy, killing three people and wounding 16 others.
23 August 1998	Wolfsburg, Lower Saxony	3	4	7	A man shot seven family members in their home, killing three.
16 June 1998	Ribnitz-Damgarten, Mecklenburg-Vorpommern	4	1	5	A man killed three people and wounded his wife before killing himself.
10 February 1998	Ludwigsdorf, Saxony	2	2	4	A Kazakh shot and killed two customs officers and wounded two bus passengers at a border checkpoint. The man had stolen one of the officer's guns and opened fire. The suspect was arrested after he injured himself.
22 November 1997	Berlin	0	5	5	A man shot at a group of women after a verbal altercation in Hellersdorf, wounding three. A friend of the women chased the man and his friend as they fled and used the shooter's gun to wound both men.
16 March 1997	Berlin	4	1	5	A family dispute escalated to a gunfight in a residential building in the Neukölln district after a mother and son shot themselves to death. The father of the family went to the other family's apartment and killed two men and injured their mother.
10 November 1996	Hamburg	2	4	6	Two people were killed and four others wounded during a gunfight in a brothel in St. Pauli.
11 June 1996	Celle, Lower Saxony	1	3	4	A 17-year-old targeting his brother's murderer opened fire as he was taken from prison, killing him and wounding three judicial officers.
12 May 1996	Berlin	6	0	6	Six men were shot in the head and killed execution-style at an apartment building in Marzahn. The murders were related to a gang rivalry among the Vietnamese diaspora in Germany.
27 December 1995	Gütersloh, North Rhine-Westphalia	1	3	4	A man shot and wounded his wife and two daughters before killing himself.
20 December 1995	Berlin	1	3	4	One person was killed and three others wounded, including a bystander, during a shootout outside Treptower Park S-Bahn station.
28 July 1995	Cologne, North Rhine-Westphalia	3	2	4	Cologne hostage crisis: A man took hostages aboard a bus in Deutz, killing two of them and wounding a responding police officer and a fleeing hostage before being killed by police.
29 March 1995	Berlin	6	0	6	Six people were fatally shot at a refugee shelter in Marzahn. The murders were related to a Vietnamese gang rivalry.
1 February 1995	Cologne, North Rhine-Westphalia	1	3	4	A murder victim's uncle opened fire during the trial at Landgericht Cologne, killing a defendant and wounding three of the killed defendant's relatives before other family members restrained the shooter.
1 January 1995	Germersheim, Rhineland-Palatinate	3	2	5	Four Communist Party of Turkey/Marxist–Leninist gunmen were shot, three fatally, by a former Turkish military policeman, after the former opened fire on first responders who had arrived to a hostage situation at a bar. One police officer was wounded.
1995	Hackenbroich, North Rhine-Westphalia	1	4	5	A circus director shot at people who were reportedly attacking him, killing one and wounding four.
29 December 1994	Siegen, North Rhine-Westphalia	1	4	5	Five people were shot at a restaurant, one fatally.
25 December 1994	Wallhausen, Rhineland-Palatinate	2	3	5	A man killed two people and wounded three others in a youth club.
12 December 1994	Dreieich, Hesse	4	0	4	A man shot and killed his wife and two teenaged sons before killing himself.
December 1994	Landsberg am Lech, Bavaria	6	0	6	A man killed his wife and four children before committing suicide.
24 June 1994	Frankfurt, Hesse	1	3	4	A career criminal opened fire along the Zeil shopping lane, killing a taxi driver and wounding three other people before being arrested.
9 March 1994	Euskirchen, North Rhine-Westphalia	6	8	14	Euskirchen court shooting: A man killed six people and wounded eight others at a court before committing suicide with a homemade bomb.
December 1993	Ebrach, Bavaria	4	0	4	A man shot and killed his wife and three children.
December 1993	Bad Waldliesborn, North Rhine-Westphalia	4	0	4	A man shot and killed his wife, daughter, and a nanny before committing suicide.
September 1993	Gäufelden, Baden-Württemberg	3	1	4	A man shot three family members, killing two, before committing suicide.
31 August 1993	Dortmund, North Rhine-Westphalia	2	3	5	A man opened fire in a bar, killing two people and wounding three others.
7 July 1993	Taucha, Saxony	4	1	5	Four former Soviet soldiers were killed and another wounded in a gunfight aboard a Russian military munitions train.
31 December 1992	Ahrensbök, Schleswig-Holstein	5	0	5	A man shot and killed his ex-girlfriend, her parents, a friend of his ex-partner, and the friend's daughter. He fled to Turkey, where he was arrested a week later.
17 September 1992	Berlin	4	0	4	Mykonos restaurant assassinations: Three Iranian opposition leaders and their translator were shot and killed at a restaurant in Wilmersdorf. The killers are believed to have been linked to Iranian intelligence.
24 August 1992	Koblenz, Rhineland-Palatinate	1	7	8	A right-wing extremist stole his father's pistol and opened fire in the city center, killing one person and wounding seven before being arrested. The gunman targeted socially marginalized people.
10 July 1992	Hamburg	0	4	4	A shooter and three bystanders were injured during a shootout between drug gangs on the Reeperbahn.
22 July 1991	Berlin	0	5	5	A Belarusian gunman shot at a group of four men, all from former Soviet countries, as they were eating in the outdoor area of a restaurant in Charlottenburg. Three of the targets as well as an uninvolved man at a different table were injured. An uninjured target fired back and injured the shooter as he fled.
18 July 1991	Frankfurt, Hesse	2	4	6	Two people were killed and four others wounded in a drive-by shooting in Innenstadt. Five of the casualties were suspected Yugoslavian gang members while one was an uninvoled passerby.
9 March 1991	Florstadt, Hesse	4	0	4	Two 17-year-olds shot and killed four people in a car and a house. Both were arrested three days later.
3 November 1990	Leipzig, Saxony	1	3	4	Officers fired into a crowd of football hooligans after the two factions engaged in clashes, killing Mike Polley and wounding three others.

=== 1980s ===
Date	Location	Dead	Injured	Total	Description
18 November 1989	Laaber, Bavaria	4	2	6	Laaber murders: Two escaped prisoners opened fire with stolen pistols during a robbery at a bar in Laaber, killing four people and wounding two others. The following day, one of the perpetrators was killed by police and the other wounded during a gunfight at Würzburg.
21 March 1989	Paderborn, North Rhine-Westphalia	5	0	5	A man shot and killed four family members before killing himself during a standoff.
13 April 1988	Nordhorn, Lower Saxony/Emsdetten, North Rhine-Westphalia	4	0	4	A man shot and killed two other men during a dispute before fleeing with his girlfriend. He shot his girlfriend dead before being fatally wounded by a police officer.
4 March 1988	Dorfen, Bavaria	4	1	5	A man killed three people and wounded one other at a police station before being fatally wounded by police.
2 November 1987	Frankfurt, Hesse	2	7	9	Runway West shooting: A left-wing activist protesting the building of a new runway at Frankfurt Airport fired on police officers stationed at the protest, killing two and wounding seven. The shooter was arrested two days later.
18 to 19 April 1987	Cologne, North Rhine-Westphalia	6	0	6	A man shot and killed five members of his family at two locations before committing suicide.
28 March 1987	Hamburg	3	1	4	A man shot three people in a prostitutes' lodging house in St. Pauli, two fatally, before killing himself.
24 September 1986	Dortmund, North Rhine-Westphalia	1	4	5	A man opened fire inside a neurological clinic, killing an assistant and wounding three other people. The shooter, who intended to set fire to the office, attempted suicide, but survived.
29 August 1985	Karlsruhe, Baden-Württemberg	5	4	9	Karlsruhe shootings: A man drove around shooting from his car, killing five people and wounding four others before being arrested.
29 September 1983	Alsdorf, North Rhine-Westphalia	2	2	4	Police officers fatally shot two hostages and wounded two bank robbers as the robbers attempted to flee the scene in a car.
3 June 1983	Eppstein, Hesse	6	14	20	Eppstein school shooting: A man entered a school and shot nineteen people, killing five, before committing suicide.
24 June 1982	Nuremberg, Bavaria	4	3	7	1982 Nuremberg shooting: A neo-Nazi opened fire at a discotheque and on the street, killing three people and wounding three others before committing suicide.
24 December 1980	Bonn, North Rhine-Westphalia	5	1	6	A man shot and killed four members of his family and wounded his son before committing suicide.
10 August 1980	Niederndodeleben, Saxony-Anhalt	4	1	5	A man shot and killed three people and wounded one other before committing suicide. The perpetrator also killed two people by strangling and beating them.

=== 1970s ===
Date	Location	Dead	Injured	Total	Description
10 July 1979	Hagen, North Rhine-Westphalia	1	3	4	An employee shot and killed one person and wounded three others at his workplace.
10 July 1979	Arnsberg, North Rhine-Westphalia	2	2	4	A Belgian soldier shot and killed two police officers and wounded another before being shot and arrested.
24 September 1978	Dortmund, North Rhine-Westphalia	2	2	4	Two police officers were investigating a report of loud noises (later determined to be Red Army Faction (RAF) members conducting target practice) when they were fired upon. In the resulting shootout, one officer and an RAF member were fatally shot, and another officer and a second RAF member were wounded.
5 September 1977	Cologne, North Rhine-Westphalia	4	0	4	Kidnapping of Hanns Martin Schleyer: Members of the Red Army Faction shot and killed four people, a private chaffeur and three police officers, in an ambush in Lindenthal.
August 1977	Frelenberg, North Rhine-Westphalia	1	5	6	A man shot and wounded five family members before committing suicide.
3 October 1976	Heide, Schleswig-Holstein	4	3	7	A man ran through the streets shooting indiscriminately, killing three people and wounding three others before killing himself.
7 April 1975	Hamburg	3	4	7	A Hungarian robber shot a woman during a jewelry robbery. During his escape, the robber killed another woman and injured four others before being killed by police.
21 August 1974	Oberkirchen/Neunkirchen, Saarland	6	1	7	A man shot six people with a pistol at multiple locations, killing five, before killing himself.
18 April 1974	Hamburg	2	2	4	A man robbing a Commerzbank location in St. Georg shot two police officers, killing one, as they responded. After a hostage situation, the gunman left the bank and was shot dead by multiple police officers, who accidentally injured a hostage.
16 December 1973	Elztal, Baden-Württemberg	3	1	4	A U.S. soldier shot and killed three fellow soldiers and wounded another at a Nike missile base.
5–6 September 1972	Munich, Bavaria	17 (Note: Including five of the perpetrators)	0	17	Munich massacre: After killing two members of the 1972 Israel Summer Olympics team and taking nine hostages, members of the terrorist organization Black September engaged in an ambush with police officers that left ten hostages, one police officer and five terrorists dead.
15 June 1972	Oberhausen, North Rhine-Westphalia	3	2	5	As a warrant was being served on a house, a married couple and two of their children fired on officers, killing three and wounding two. After a protracted gunfight, the four were arrested. The two children were not charged due to their age, while the husband and wife were convicted.
28 May 1972	Essen, North Rhine-Westphalia	5	1	6	Essen shooting: A man killed five people at multiple locations, including his wife and two children, before being shot by police and arrested.
28 February 1972	Hüfingen, Baden-Württemberg	3	1	4	An elderly gunman killed two neighbours and injured another before killing himself.
6 February 1972	Brühl, North Rhine-Westphalia	5	0	5	Two Black September gunmen killed five Jordanian labourers inside their basement flat.
21 December 1971	Wedel, Schleswig-Holstein	5	0	5	A woman shot and killed her husband, two children, and a friend at her house before killing herself.
27 June 1970	Berlin	1	3	4	Following several clashes between Iranian and German pimps, the German group opened fire on the Iranians during a meeting at a restaurant in Charlottenburg, killing one Iranian and wounding three.
20 April 1970	Fahrdorf, Schleswig-Holstein	9	0	9	A man killed himself, his wife and seven children in a suicide pact agreed by the couple.

=== 1960s ===
Date	Location	Dead	Injured	Total	Description
6 November 1969	Bordesholm, Schleswig-Holstein	1	4	5	A fired factory worker returned with a rifle and opened fire, killing a 17-year-old who had accompanied him to the factory. He went to his parents' apartment and wounded his father, then traveled to the train station and began firing at passersby, wounding three before being arrested.
23 September 1969	Ahlen, North Rhine-Westphalia	6	0	6	A woman drugged six family members before shooting them to death. She then committed suicide by overdose.
20 January 1969	Lebach, Saarland	4	1	5	Two men broke into a Bundeswehr barracks and shot four sleeping soldiers to death. One soldier was shot and stabbed, but survived.
27 July 1968	Sembach, Rhineland-Palatinate	4	0	4	A U.S. Air Force master sergeant shot and killed three of his family members at Sembach Air Base before killing himself.
21 May 1960	Frankfurt, Hesse	2	6	7	A man fired from his apartment window, killing one person and wounding six others. He shot himself to death as police entered the residence.

=== 1950s ===
Date	Location	Dead	Injured	Total	Description
1959	Landau/Ingelheim am Rhein, Rhineland-Palatinate	4	2	6	A man killed his wife at a psychiatric hospital. He then shot and killed his mother-in-law and infant son and wounded two other people at a house. He killed himself in the house after setting a fire and shooting at first responders.
27 November 1952	Gera, Thuringia	4	2+	6	A Soviet soldier armed with a handgun opened fire on board of a train, killing four and wounding several others before being subdued.
4 March 1951	Wickersrode, Hesse	3	3	6	A man opened fire at a farmer's meeting, killing three people and wounding three others.
19 April 1950	Aachen, North Rhine-Westphalia	4	0	4	A woman shot and killed her four children and tried to kill herself using a bladed weapon.

=== 1940s ===
Date	Location	Dead	Injured	Total	Description
1 May 1949	Stuttgart and Möglingen, Baden-Württemberg	3	4	7	Stuttgart and Möglingen killing spree: A U.S. military police officer shot and killed three others and injured four with a carbine and a car before turning himself in the next day.

=== 1930s ===
Date	Location	Dead	Injured	Total	Description
28 October 1934	Saalfeld, Thuringia	4	1-2	5-6	A man killed his two children, another child and himself. He also wounded his wife and possibly wounded his neighbour.
24/25 March 1932	Jena, Thuringia	7	0	7	A man killed six family members and himself.
9 February 1931	Altlandsberg, Brandenburg	6	1	7	A man shot and killed his wife, two children, mother-in-law, and sister-in-law, then wounded his brother-in-law when he arrived home and killed himself.

=== 1920s ===
Date	Location	Dead	Injured	Total	Description
5 September 1927	Niedermöllrich, Hesse	1	5	6	A man shot and killed one soldier and wounded five others, before being killed by hand grenades.
22 April 1926	Berlin	2	2	4	A recently released convict shot four family members, killing his daughter and mother-in-law, before attempting suicide by jumping.
28 March 1922	Berlin	1	9	10	Attempted assassination of Pavel Milyukov: Ten people were shot at the old Berlin concert hall when two gunmen attempted to assassinate politician Pavel Milyukov. Statesman Vladimir Dmitrievich Nabokov was killed and nine others were wounded.

=== 1910s ===
Date	Location	Dead	Injured	Total	Description
June 1917	Gotha, Thuringia	5	2	7	A man killed his five children and injured his wife before also injuring himself in an attempted suicide.
April 1916	Mühlbach, Bavaria	7	0	7	A man shot and killed six family members before killing himself.
4 September 1913	Mühlhausen an der Enz, Baden-Württemberg	9	11	20	Mühlhausen an der Enz shooting: After murdering five family members, a man shot and killed nine people and wounded eleven before being severely beaten by a mob and apprehended by police.
20 June 1913	Bremen	4	21	25	Bremen school shooting: A man entered a school and opened fire on students and faculty, killing four people and wounding 21 others before being arrested. A fifth victim died in an accident during evacuation.
12 February 1912	Reichenbach im Vogtland, Saxony	7	0	7	A man killed six family members before committing suicide.
13 July 1910	Helmstedt, Hanover	4	3	7	A man killed three family members and injured three children before committing suicide.

=== 1900s ===
Date	Location	Dead	Injured	Total	Description
10 March 1907	Dresden, Saxony	7	0	7	A man killed six family members before committing suicide.
