= 1999 Bielefeld shooting =

Mass murder in Bielefeld, Germany

- Location: 52.049°N 8.516°E; Koblenzer Straße; Bielefeld, North Rhine-Westphalia, Germany
- Date: 9 November 1999; 26 years ago 20:45 (CEST)
- Target: Tetik family
- Attack type: Mass shooting, mass murder, murder–suicide
- Weapon: CZ 7.65 mm handgun
- Deaths: 8 (including the perpetrator)
- Perpetrator: Mehmet Kaya
- Motive: Revenge for romantic rejection

On 9 November 1999, a mass murder took place at an apartment building in Bielefeld, North Rhine-Westphalia, Germany. Seven members of the Tetik family were killed in a shooting at their home. The gunman killed himself hours later when he was caught by police in Tübingen.

== Shooting ==
On the evening of 9 November 1999, at around 18:00, Mehmet Kaya told his wife that he was going to drive his VW bus out of town for a work-related activity. Armed with a loaded handgun and three magazines, he drove from his home in Tübingen to Bielefeld and arrived at his destination just after 20:00. At 20:45, Kaya entered a six-floor housing complex in Sudbrack borough and rang the doorbell of a random apartment. He was remotely buzzed in and headed for apartment 21 on the first floor, where the 13-person Tetik family resided.

The door was opened by Ayşe Tetik, the wife of the Tetik son, who was immediately shot twice by Kaya. Entering the living room, he shot Mehmet Tetik and his brother-in-law Kemal Çerçi as they were sitting on a couch. The mother of the household, Fatima, tried to pull Kaya to the ground, pleading with him to "please not kill them", but Kaya ignored her and proceeded to shoot her husband Halit Tetik. Kaya followed the fleeing Ayşe Çerçi into a bedroom, where he shot her and her two teenage sisters Esengül and Zübeyde Tetik. Kaya then walked out of the apartment, returned to his car and drove back onto the Autobahn. The murders occurred in the span of just over a minute. Kaya reloaded the magazine four times and 18 casings were found at the scene.

At 20:49, four minutes after the shooting, police arrived at the scene, having been called by neighbours who heard the gunshots. Officers found six of the victims dead while two women, 53-year-old Fatima Tetik and 17-year-old Esengül Tetik, were still alive. Fatima was unharmed, but Esengül was in critical condition and had to be resuscitated at the scene. Esengül remained in a coma and died of her injuries in the afternoon of the following day. In the bedroom, officers found four surviving children, aged 3 to 15. One of the children identified the attacker to officers, with police launching a nationwide manhunt for Kaya at 21:30.

Police, including SEK units, surveiled all major roadways between North Rhine-Westphalia and Baden-Württemberg. A patrol car spotted Kaya's distinct red-white vehicle on B27 near Reutlingen and engaged him in a car chase. Just before reaching the junction into Tübingen, Kaya steered off the road, exited the car and fired two fatal gunshots into his temple.

== Victims ==
All victims were part of the same Turkish family from Hatay Province. The father was born in the village Topraktutan, while his oldest daughter and son were born in Antakya. All had been shot in the head. The deceased are:

- Halit Tetik (61), father
- Mehmet Tetik (29), son
- Kemal Çerçi (31), son-in-law
- Ayşe Tetik (32), daughter-in-law
- Ayşe Çerçi (26), daughter
- Zübeyde Tetik (19), daughter
- Esengül Tetik (17), daughter

Five children, all siblings, survived the shooting unharmed. 15-year-old Fatoş and 9-year-old Ali had hidden themselves away when the shooter entered the bedroom. 13-year-old Gül hid in the living room when the gunman entered and was able to flee into the basement until rescue. Three-year-old triplets Meryem and Cafer were sleeping in an adjacent room; the third triplet Hatice had spent the night at a hospital for medical treatment.

== Perpetrator ==
Mehmet Kaya was born in 1965 in Hasköy, Uşak Province, Turkey, as the son of an imam. He graduated Kütahya İmam-Hatip High School in 1983 and studied theology at Atatürk University before transferring to Dokuz Eylül University in 1984. Kaya then interned as a religious official at Buca Müftülüğü Office in İzmir since 1986. He was employed as a civil servant under the Presidency of Religious Affairs (DİB) and served as a preacher in Aliağa for four years, during which time he was married. In the early 1990s, Kaya applied for a transfer abroad to the DİB, which was granted and fulfilled on 28 December 1992. He initially worked as a cleric employee in the Religious Services Attaché of the Consulate-General of Turkey in Münster, then worked as an Islamic teacher at Bielefeld Central Mosque, operated by the Turkish-Islamic Union for Religious Affairs (DİTİB). He, his wife and their four children lived with two of Kaya's sisters and brothers. Kaya's wife was pregnant with a fifth child at the time of the shooting.

Kaya headed Quran courses at the Bielefeld mosque for about four years until filing a resignation on 1 September 1998. Officially, he stated his reasons for doing so as "familial" and that he was going to pursue a master's degree. However, Kaya had been the subject of harassment complaints by parents, who alleged that he was grooming and molesting girls under his tutorship. Mosque officials and friends of Kaya stated that the resignation was forced after it was discovered that he had sexual relations with a then-underaged Zübeyde Tetik. He had impregnated her and attempted to convince her parents to let Zübeyde become his second wife. The proposal was denied and the pregnancy was terminated. Kaya subsequently moved to Tübingen, but made repeated threats against the family. In Tübingen, Kaya served with the Turkish Association in an unpaid position as a replacement imam at a local mosque. On the day of the shooting, he had learned that Zübeyde had married a paternal cousin, Ahmet Çerçi, in a ceremony in Latakia, Syria, on 25 July 1999. Before the murders, the Tetik family told others that the wedding had been arranged in order to dissuade Kaya from further marriage proposals. Despite the rape accusations and threats, Kaya did not have a criminal record and was regarded as quiet and unremarkable. The pistol used in the murders was unregistered and illegally in his possession. The children of the Tetik family had identified Kaya to police as "Mehmet Hoca".

== Aftermath ==
Bielefeld Prosecutor Klaus Metzler and Bielefeld Police Homicide Squad Chief Hartmut Runte called the shooting "unprecedented". The shooting came amidst a multitude of similar spree killings, including the Bad Reichenhall shooting and the Dillingen shooting. The day prior in Nidderau, a 38-year-old German man heavily injured three people in a random axe attack. The day of the shooting, a 24-year-old Turkish man had stabbed his wife to death and also committed suicide in Duisburg, while in Meißen, a 15-year-old schoolboy killed his teacher in a stabbing attack.

Immediately after the shooting, on 10 November, German newspapers initially misreported that the perpetrator had become obsessed with Zübeyde's younger sister Esengül, and wrongly referred to the shooter and victims as Kurds. WDR ran a special program about the shooting, in which Faruk Şen, president of the Essen-based Centre for Turkish Studies and Integration Research, denounced the killings. Şen stated that there were "no cultural connections" and that Kaya's marriage request was not reflective of Turkish culture, with polygamy in Turkey being illegal.

Relatives of the Tetik family gathered in Antakya to mourn the dead. In Mehmet Kaya's hometown, his mother was treated for a nervous breakdown after hearing the news. The survivors of the shooting received psychological care at a hospital and were provided with a fully furnished apartment to stay in to avoid "a return to the bloody place of the incident".

== See also ==
- List of mass shootings in Germany
