= Peyerl (name) =

German surname

Peyerl is a German surname. Notable people with the name include:

- Paul Peyerl, 16th-century German musician and repairer
- Martin Peyerl, 16-year old German student, perpetrator of the Bad Reichenhall shootings
