= 2026 Stade shooting =

Mass shooting in Stade, Germany

- Location: 53.59286°N 9.47095°E; Stade, Lower Saxony, Germany
- Date: 29 June 2026 c. 12:00 (CEST; UTC+02:00)
- Attack type: Mass shooting
- Weapon: Beretta 70 semi-automatic pistol
- Deaths: 6
- Perpetrator: Fatih Khan Gazioğlu
- Motive: Child custody dispute

On 29 June 2026, a mass shooting took place in a youth welfare center in Stade, Lower Saxony, Germany. Six people were killed, all of them social workers for the facility or state youth welfare authority. Two people were arrested, including the alleged shooter. Police believe that the shooting was motivated by a child custody dispute.

On 21 July, the suspect was found dead in his jail cell in an apparent suicide.

On 12 November 2026 the Public Prosecutor's Office charged the shooters wife and the 65 year old woman, who drove the getaway car, with aiding and abetting murder.

== Background ==
Germany has strict firearm regulations and a relatively low rate of gun-related violence compared to many other countries. Mass shootings are described as "rare, but not unheard of".

== Shooting ==
The shooting took place in the group home section of a mother-child welfare facility (Mutter-Kind-Einrichtung) in the city centre of Stade. Four people died in the immediate aftermath; one person was revived by first responders before dying. The sixth fatality was a heavily wounded man who died in hospital. The fatalities were four women and two men, three of whom were employees of the facility while the others were employees of Jugendamt Hanover. Previous reports mentioned a "single-digit" count of injured, although it was later clarified that this had referred to the two people who died of their injuries shortly after. Police arrived at the scene at around 12:10. Two people fled the scene in a car, but were apprehended on the B73 on the outskirts of Stade after police shot out one of their tires.

== Investigation ==
Police officials stated that the attack appeared to be connected to a personal custody dispute and emphasized that the situation was under control following the arrest of the suspect and other individuals. Authorities confirmed that there was no ongoing threat to the public after the immediate police operation concluded. A homicide division was assembled to take over the investigation. On 30 June, Amtsgericht Stade issued an arrest warrant against the suspect for murder under specific aggravating circumstances, with the public prosecutor's office citing evidence for treachery and base motives in the commission of the crime.

Investigators have ruled out organised crime, political extremism, or femicide, with Lüneburg police stating that the crime is suspected to have a family-related background, describing the shooting as an "extended familial tragedy [...] related to the periphery of the youth welfare facility". During a press conference, Lüneburg police president Kathrin Schuol clarified that the suspected shooter had a custody dispute over his three-month-old daughter.

The presumed shooter was identified, in accordance with German privacy laws, as Fatih Khan G., a 45-year-old Turkish citizen born in Germany, residing in the Hanover Region. Turkish media later identified him as Fatih Khan Gazioğlu. He did not have a firearm licence and according to a NDR investigation, the handgun used in the shooting was purchased for €4,000 along with 21 rounds of ammunition in the Kurfürstendamm area of Berlin a week earlier. According to Gazioğlu, he had sent his wife and child out of the room before opening fire and initially intended to kill himself afterwards, but realised he had used up all his ammunition.

Fatih Gazioğlu was born on 4 April 1981 in Goslar, Lower Saxony, to a Turkish Kurd family. After finishing Abitur, he relocated to Turkey, settling in Gaziantep. In May 2007, he was charged with aggravated sexual assault in Kahramanmaraş and by 2010, he was imprisoned. During his incarceration, Gazioğlu married and gained prison furlough following a transfer to Türkoğlu. In March 2017, Gazioğlu failed to return to prison and was listed as a fugitive. Gazioğlu stayed in Georgia between 2017 and 2019, during which time he abused his wife and began using alcohol and drugs. During the same timeframe, he occasionally stayed in Germany, Austria, Turkey, Spain, and Morocco, maintaining residency in the former two countries. In June 2022, Gazioğlu was accused of raping his oldest daughter from a previous marriage in Gaziantep and charged with sexual assault. He relinquished his residency status in Germany in November 2022 and lived in Latvia until 2023. In September 2024, he sought entry into Croatia under international protection, but was denied. Upon his return to Germany, Gazioğlu did not renew his residency status. He married his latest wife, a divorced mother of two from Marburg-Biedenkopf, in 2025.

In early 2026, the suspect's youngest daughter, then five weeks old, had been hospitalised at Hannover Medical School for an intracranial hemorrhage. A physician voiced concerns that the suspect may have shaken the infant, which was denied by both parents, who stated that the girl's father had accidentally bumped foreheads with the child while all three were sleeping in the same bed. The suspect eventually notified police to stop a scheduled emergency surgery. On 22 April, hospital staff filed a case for threat, with the suspect filing a case for false accusation on 18 May. Jugendamt took custody of the child from both parents and arranged for her to be housed in the welfare facility, beginning with her hospital release on 15 May. The facility urged Jugendamt to reunite the mother with the child, which was granted on 26 May. The day of the shooting, the suspect had arrived at the facility for a scheduled appointment to discuss future custody, as well as the suspect's prior aggressive behavior. His wife and the child, who were living at the facility due to the previous ruling, were present but not injured.

The suspect was accompanied by a 65-year-old woman from Bremen, who had driven the car during the escape. She was identified as a family counselor working for a migrant counseling NGO in Bremen. The NGO later denied that the woman was in Stade as part of her job with them and stated that they were unaware of the shooter or his family ever seeking assistance from them. Three days before the shooting, the counselor sent a 20-page letter via Email to several news outlets, accusing hospital staff, Jugendamt and the judiciary of making "erroneous decisions and contradictions" based on "false information" by an employee of Jugendamt to the welfare facility. She also claimed to the godmother of the suspect's daughter. On 2 July State Commissioner for migration and inclusion, Deniz Kurku, publicly identified the woman as being his mother-in-law. A third individual, the suspect's 34-year-old wife, was detained for questioning. Both women were released from custody on 30 June. According to the public prosecutor's office, the women are still being formally investigated, though neither were under significant suspicion. In early July, there were media reports that the suspected getaway driver had gone into hiding, which state authorities said was unconfirmed.

The suspect was found dead in his prison cell at the Bremervörde JVA early morning on 21 July 2026. An emergency physician found the cause of death to be asphyxiation and police declared the death a suicide. Although the suspect had previously voiced intentions to kill himself after the shooting, he later agreed to aid in the investigation and due to a lack of suicide threats, the 24-hour surveillance system in his cell was shut down the day before his death. The Christian Democratic Union (CDU) criticised Lower Saxony Minister of Justice Kathrin Wahlmann for failure to prevent the suicide, with Carina Hermann demanding that the ministry of justice provide a full report on the security measures in place at the time.

The city council of Stade voiced concerns that the shooting would be used to spread xenophobic sentiments by right-wing media. In July 2026, a woman from Laatzen filed a complaint against the right-wing news portal Nius, after the site falsely claimed that she was a roommate of the suspect, which is believed to have stemmed from a case of mistaken identity due to similar names. The article speculated about potential involvement of the roommate in the shooting and included detailed information on the wrong woman's workplace as well as a photo of her. Nius included an acknowledgement of the mistake at the end of the article following a complaint to Hanover Police, but did not remove the article.

With investigations dragging on as of early September 2026, reporters published additional material, apparently from investigation files. A police officer told the investigators how she arrived at the scene outside the youth welfare center and witnessed the shooters wife, identified as "Enise Ö.", shouting insults, pushing and beating a female social worker, who already was mortally wounded from gunfire and who later succumbed to her injuries.

On 12 November 2026 the Public Prosecutor's Office charged the shooters wife and the 65 year old woman, who drove the getaway car, with aiding and abetting murder. The court has to admit the indictment.

== Reactions ==
A memorial service was held at St. Wilhadi Church on 30 June, led by Bishop of Stade Sabine Preuschoff, along with Bishop of Hanover Ralf Meister and minister-president of Lower Saxony Olaf Lies. In the afternoon of 4 July, a memorial march was held in Stade with 350 participants. The same evening, a scheduled cultural program organised by Stade Marketing und Tourismus GmbH was changed on short notice to provide pastoral care for residents.

A donation fund was opened for the family of one of the victims, a 32-year-old Jugendamt worker who had recently lost her husband, making both of her children orphans. Within two days, the fund collected over €630,000. By 7 July, the amount increased to over €785,000 by over 29,500 donors. The parents' association of Stade's kindergarten also created a donation commission for the families of all six victims, which collected €41,000 as of 6 July.

Local authorities in Stade and the state of Lower Saxony expressed shock and condolences following the shooting. Behrens described the incident as an "extremely violent crime" and said that investigators were working "under high pressure" to establish the exact circumstances and motive. German president Frank-Walter Steinmeier expressed condolences to the victims' families and said he was deeply shocked by the violence. National and regional political leaders similarly issued statements of sympathy, praising emergency responders for their rapid intervention at the scene.

WDR and NDR reported that the suspected shooter might be a member of the Miri-Clan, which has an active presence in Stade, since a member had a child at the facility. During the press conference, held on the evening after the shooting, police responded to the rumour, saying that they did not have proof for the claim. The following day, police president Schuol and Minister of the Interior Daniela Behrens stated that the shooting had "nothing to do" with clan crime. On 1 July, Tagesschau reported that "available hints no longer support the suspicion" of clan membership.

The shooting has been cited as an example of increased violence against public service workers. German Civil Service Federation chairman Volker Geyer and the trade union Ver.di have called for increased protection measures for civil servants and social workers. On 1 July, a memorial service by employees of Jugendamt Hanover was held in the Marktkirche. Security measures were increased in Hanover, where Jugendamt is set to work more closely with police to organise potentially dangerorus meetings at high-security locations, receive specialised training for conflict resolution, and implement the use of panic buttons for employees. Less strict measures were also put in place in Burgdorf, where entry into the main municipal building containing youth welfare services was limited, and Lehrte, where contact with youth services became only allowed with appointments,

== See also ==
- List of mass shootings in Germany
