= Murder of Sadia Sheikh =

2007 Pakistani–Belgian honour killing incident

Sadia Sheikh
- Born: Brussels, Belgium
- Died: 22 October 2007; Charleroi, Belgium
- Resting place: Pakistan
- Education: Haute Ecole provinciale de Charleroi (HEPCUT), Athénée Royal Vauban
- Occupation: (at time of death) Student at HEPCUT
- Known for: Being the victim of an honour killing in Charleroi

The honour killing of Sadia Sheikh occurred on 22 October 2007, when a 20-year-old Belgian woman of Pakistani heritage was fatally shot by her brother, an act of sororicide. The murder occurred in Lodelinsart, Charleroi. After her parents pressured her to marry a cousin she had never met, Sheikh left her family home and later moved in with a Belgian man, but she had visited in an attempt to reconcile. Her brother, Mudusar Sheikh, confessed to the murder during a 2011 trial, asserting that he had acted alone, but the jury found all four family members guilty and sentenced each to prison. This case has been recognized as Belgium's first honour killing trial.

== Background ==
Born in Pakistan in 1949, Sheikh's father, Tarik Mahmood Sheikh, was himself wed by arranged marriage to her mother, Parveen Zahida. Tarik arrived in Belgium in 1973. The children were born in Brussels, and the family lived in Charleroi.

Sheikh was a student at the Athénée Royal Vauban; and then Haute Ecole provinciale de Charleroi (HEPCUT), which merged into the Haute École provinciale de Hainaut Condorcet.

When Sheikh's parents, who owned businesses in both Belgium and Pakistan, attempted to force her to accept an arranged marriage to a cousin she had never met in Pakistan, she left home to study law. She felt threatened to the point that she drew up a will at a centre for victims of domestic violence. Soon after, she moved in with Jean, a Belgian man her age. While unwilling to comply with her family's demands, she had not surrendered the hope of reconciliation. On 22 October, then in her final year of law school, she visited her family in hopes of mending the rift, but instead she was shot three times. In the shooting, her sister Sariya Sheikh was also wounded by a bullet in the arm.

== Trial and punishment ==
On 21 November 2011, Sheikh's family—including her parents, brother Mudusar and sister Sariya—stood trial for her death. Sheikh's brother was accused of the shooting, while the rest of the family was accused of aiding and abetting the murder and "attempting to arrange a marriage." Prosecutors sought 20 – 30 years for Sariya Sheikh, who they claimed held Sheikh while she was shot, and life imprisonment for the rest of her family. The trial was held in Mons.

During the trial, Mudusar Sheikh confessed to the crime, also claiming that he attempted to murder his sister Sariya. Other members of the family also claimed that Mudusar Sheikh was solely responsible for the murder. According to them, he acted in rage, but Mudusar Sheikh himself testified that the act was premeditated. He clarified that "I didn't want to take her (Sadia's) life, but to make her feel as bad as I felt." During the trial, evidence had been presented to suggest that Mudusar Sheikh, himself to marry a cousin in Pakistan, had been very close to his sister Sadia, his closest sibling in age.

On 9 December 2011, the jury found all four family members guilty of the murder, with the aggravating factor that it was an honour killing, and the brother and father guilty of attempting to force an arranged marriage. Sentencing was handed down on 12 December. The court found that the parents had orchestrated the event, ordering their son to do the shooting. For that reason, although Mudusar Sheikh himself was sentenced to 15 years, Sheikh's mother and father were sentenced to 20 and 25 respectively. The 22-year-old Sariya Sheikh, five months pregnant at the time of sentencing, was given five years, a light sentence due to her youth at the time of the crime. In December 2011 Sheikh's parents were reported to be appealing their sentences. Sariya Sheikh also entered an appeal, to preserve the right, but it was reported she may not follow through if her attorneys do not find sufficient grounds.

The case has been called Belgium's first honour killing trial. It has been positioned as a gender equality issue by civil rights groups. During the trial, the courthouse had to be briefly cleared when it received a bomb threat from a person alleging to be part of a Pakistani organization, but the threat proved false.

Parveen Zahida was released after six years of prison.

== Commentary ==
Following the court's verdict, the English-language Pakistani newspaper Dawn commented that Pakistan "would do well to take a leaf out of Belgium's book" given the regularity of reported honour killings in Pakistan and the common lack of punishment. The editorial laments that the "honour-killing debate is still at that medieval stage" in their country.

== Aftermath ==
Sadia's burial took place in Pakistan.

== In popular culture ==
The film A Wedding (2016) is based on this case.

== See also ==
Honour killings of people of Pakistani heritage outside of Pakistan

- Shafilea Ahmed (United Kingdom)
- Sandeela Kanwal (United States)
- Gazala Khan (Denmark)
- Samaira Nazir (United Kingdom)
- Aqsa Parvez (Canada)
- Hina Saleem (Italy)
