= Azumi Muto =

Japanese model

Kakeru Takamine (高峯 駆)
- Born: Azumi Mutō (武藤亜澄); June 13, 1986; Shibuya, Tokyo, Japan
- Died: December 30, 2006 (aged 20)
- Modeling information
- Height: 1.57 m (5 ft 2 in)

Azumi Muto (武藤 亜澄, Mutō Azumi; June 13, 1986 – December 30, 2006) was a Japanese pin-up model and aspiring actress for an agency in Tokyo, Japan. She was murdered by her 21-year-old brother Yuki Muto (武藤 勇貴, Mutō Yūki) (born 1985) on December 30, 2006. Her death aroused the tabloids' notice for the circumstances surrounding the crime.

== Life and career ==
Muto's father and mother were both dentists and she was brought up in a relatively affluent environment, but she was rebellious against her parents and ran away from her home between December 2004 and May 2005. Her stage name, which she had chosen herself, was Kakeru Takamine (高峯 駆, Takamine Kakeru). She filled the role of a supporting actor on an incest-themed V-Cinema adaptation of Cream Lemon. Her role was a woman who wore a blue commando uniform. After her death, the Tokyo District Public Prosecutor's Office denied Yuki's incestuous interest in Azumi, which some tabloids had suspected.

She also made her stage debut in 2006. Her final performance, as that of a nurse, took place on December 10, 2006. She apparently had told her friends that there were problems in the family regarding her brother's mental state a few days before the murder took place.

== Death ==
On December 30, 2006, in Tokyo, Yuki beat her with a wooden sword, and strangled her with a towel. She was finally drowned in a bath. He dismembered her body with a saw and a large knife. He was arrested on January 4, 2007. He hid the body parts in various places in his room in Hatagaya of Shibuya. Yuki sliced off his sister's breasts and genitals after he killed her. He put them through the garbage disposal in the sink. He said that it was in order to hide her gender after the police found the body. The Tokyo District Public Prosecutor's Office said that Yuki was not a necrophile nor a cannibal.

Yuki was bothered by his younger sister Azumi teasing him about being a failure and telling him that he had "no ambition" in life. It was apparently the talk of him having no ambition that prompted him to murder his sister. Yuki had failed repeatedly to pass college entrance exams. Prosecutors claim this pressure contributed to his psychotic stress. Later, the police were criticized for abandonment of his weapons.

On May 12, 2008, prosecutors requested 17 years imprisonment for Yuki, whereas his psychiatrist claimed that he had diminished responsibility or was criminally insane. On May 27, 2008, the Tokyo District Court sentenced him to 7 years imprisonment, saying that he was criminally insane when he dismembered her body. On April 28, 2009, however, the Tokyo High Court revoked his original sentence, sentencing him to 12 years.

== Film ==
- くりいむレモン プールサイドの亜美, AMG entertainment, October 27, 2006
