= Sororicide =

Act of killing one's sister

Sororicide (from Latin sororicidium; from soror 'sister' and -cīdium 'killing') is the act of murdering one's own sister.

There are a number of examples of sororicide and fratricide in adolescents, even pre-adolescents, where sibling rivalry and resulting physical aggression can get out of hand and lead to the death of one of them, particularly when a potent weapon is available or one is significantly older than the other and misjudges their own strength.

== Known or suspected examples ==
- Berenice IV of Egypt is believed to have poisoned her sister Cleopatra VI Tryphaena in 57 BC. She was later beheaded on the orders of her father, Ptolemy XII.
- Cleopatra VII of Egypt requested the execution of her sister, Arsinoe IV, (who was guilty of treason) which was carried out under the orders of her husband, then lover, Mark Antony, in 41 BC.
- Roman emperor Caligula, according to historian Suetonius, killed his sister Drusilla after learning that she was pregnant with his child in AD 38. Most historians now believe that she probably died of fever.
- Roman emperor Commodus ordered his older sister Lucilla to be put to death in AD 182, after she was implicated in plots with members of the Senate to overthrow him.
- Italian poet Isabella di Morra was killed by her brothers around 1546 for a suspected affair with a married nobleman, whom they also murdered.
- Piedad Martínez del Águila killed four of her younger siblings, including two sisters, between 1965 and 1966.
- Ronald DeFeo Jr. shot his two sisters, Allison and Dawn, in 1974. Their murders became the inspiration for the Amityville Horror books and films.
- David Brom murdered his sister with an ax, alongside his brother, mother, and father in 1988.
- Karla Homolka and her fiancé Paul Bernardo drugged and raped Homolka's younger sister Tammy, who subsequently choked to death on her vomit, in 1990 in St. Catharines, Canada; They later kidnapped, tortured and murdered two other girls in 1991 and 1992.
- Martin Peyerl killed his sister Daniela in the Bad Reichenhall Shootings.
- Hatun Sürücü was murdered by her brother in Germany in 2005.
- Yuki Muto murdered his sister Azumi Muto on December 30, 2006 in Japan.
- Sadia Sheikh was murdered by her brother in 2007 in Belgium.
- Aqsa Parvez was murdered by her brother in 2007 in Canada.
- Ella Bennett, 4, was murdered by her thirteen-year-old brother, Paris Bennett in Abilene, Texas.
- Morsal Obeidi was murdered by her brother in 2008 in Germany.
- Saima Khan, a 34-year-old carer and mother of three, was killed by her 27-year-old sister, Sabah Khan, on 23 May 2016 in Luton, Bedfordshire.

== See also ==
- List of types of killing: killing of family members
- Fratricide, the killing of one's brother
- Filicide, the killing of a child by their parent
  - Infanticide, killing of an infant under the age of one year
- Parricide, the killing of one's parents or another close relative
  - Patricide and matricide, the killing of a father or mother respectively by their child
- Mariticide, the killing of one's spouse
  - Uxoricide, the killing of one's wife
