= 2023 Hamburg shooting =

Mass shooting in Hamburg, Germany

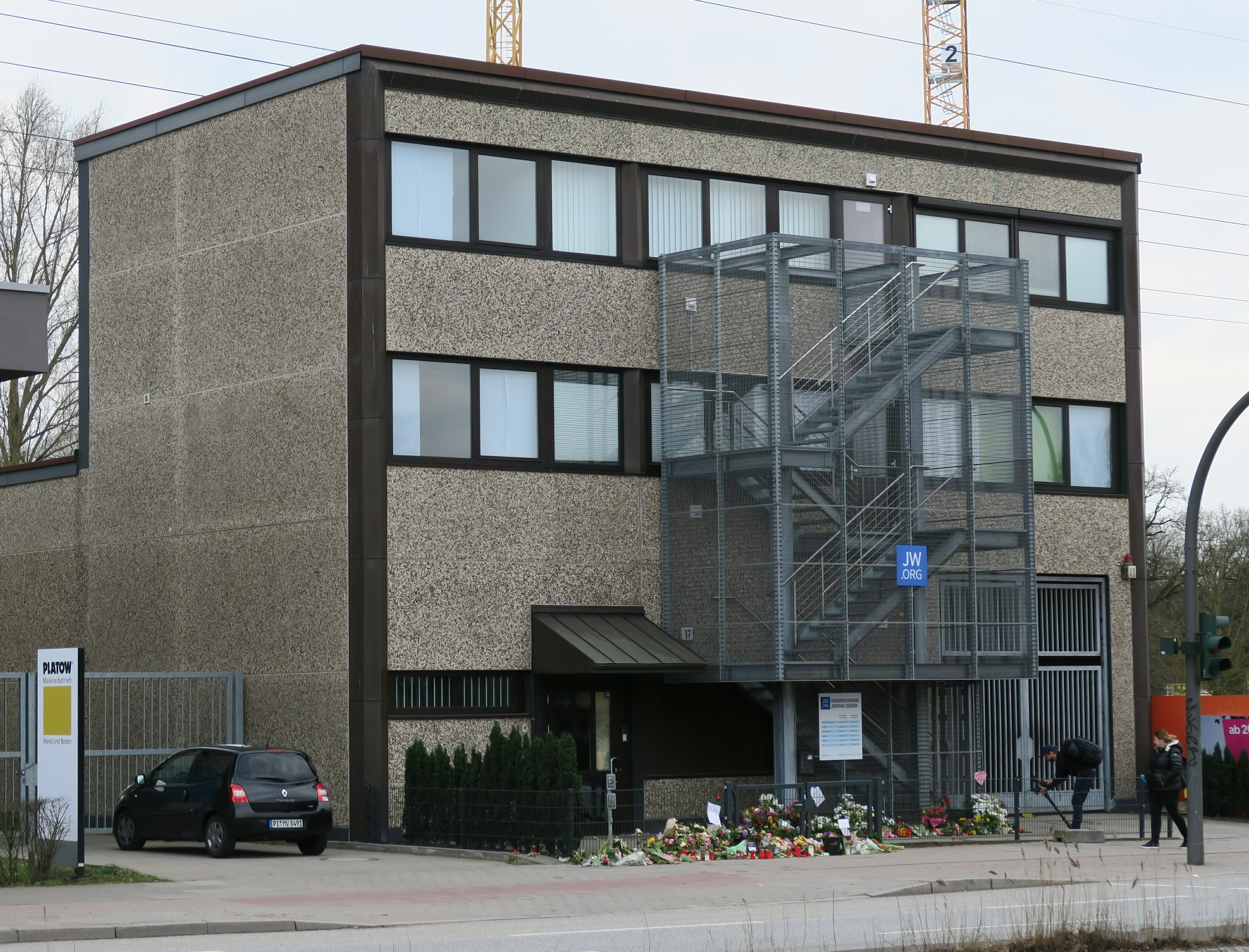
- The Kingdom Hall at 17 Deelbögestrasse in the Alsterdorf quarter of Hamburg, where the attack took place

- 2023 Hamburg shooting (Hamburg)
- Location: 53°36′09″N 09°59′25″E; Jehovah's Witnesses Kingdom Hall, on Deelbögestrasse, Hamburg, Germany
- Date: 9 March 2023; 3 years ago c. 9:00 p.m. – 9:11 p.m. (CET, UTC+01:00)
- Target: Jehovah's Witnesses members
- Attack type: Mass murder, mass shooting, murder–suicide
- Weapon: 9mm Heckler & Koch P30 semi-automatic pistol
- Deaths: 7 (including the perpetrator)
- Injuries: 8
- Perpetrator: Philipp Fusz
- Motive: Hatred towards Jehovah's Witnesses and his former employer (possible)

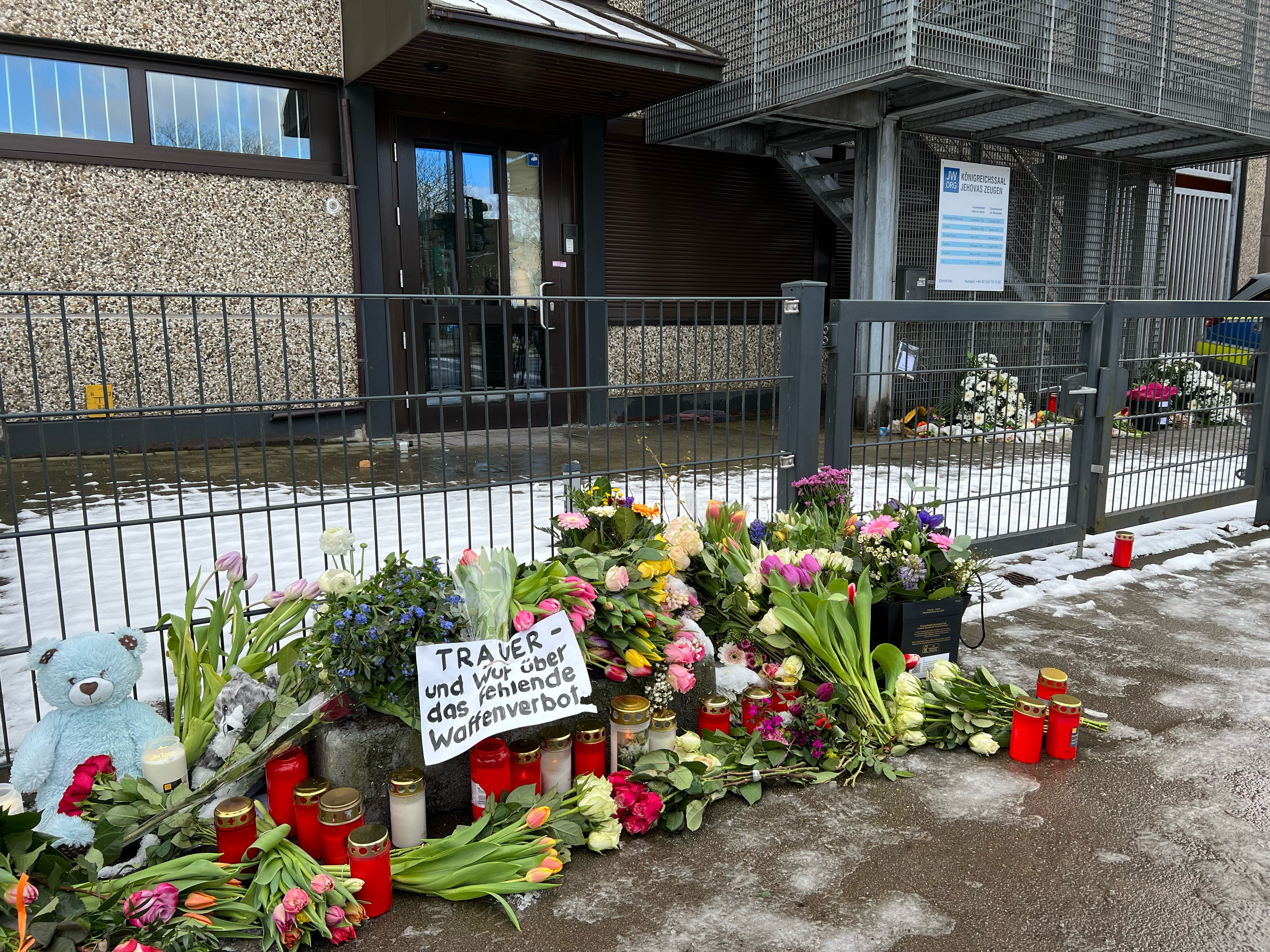
Flowers laid down in front of the Kingdom Hall of Jehovah's Witnesses in Hamburg-Alsterdorf after a shooting two days before. In addition, there is a sign with the inscription: "Trauer und Wut über das fehlende Waffenverbot" (translated to English: "Mourning and anger over the lack of a weapons ban").

On 9 March 2023, a mass shooting occurred at a Jehovah's Witnesses Kingdom Hall in the Alsterdorf quarter of Hamburg, Germany. The shooter, identified as 35-year-old Philipp Fusz, entered the building after a service was held there and opened fire, killing six people and injuring eight others, before killing himself minutes later. One of the fatalities was pregnant, leading to the foetus's loss. Fusz was a former member of the Jehovah's Witnesses, had no previous criminal record, and was not a known extremist. Police received an anonymous letter indicating he was angry at Witnesses and his former employer, which may help them determine a motive.

== Shooting ==
On the evening of 9 March 2023, a service was held at the Kingdom Hall on Deelbögestrasse in the Alsterdorf quarter of Hamburg, which ran from 7:00 p.m. to 8:45 p.m. and was physically attended by 36 people, with others watching online via a livestream. 50 people were present inside the building, according to Hamburg police chief Matthias Tresp, when the gunman arrived at around 9:00 p.m., shortly after the service had ended. Armed with a semi-automatic pistol and a large quantity of ammunition, he opened fire outside the building, shooting ten rounds into a vehicle that was about to pull out of the parking lot. The female driver escaped with minor injuries and alerted the police.

The gunman then shot ten more rounds through the window of a ground-floor meeting room before entering the building and shooting indiscriminately, killing and injuring several people. A total of 135 rounds from nine 15-round magazines were fired during the attack, with the police later finding an additional 24 magazines at the scene—22 in the gunman's backpack and two more on his body. A neighbor captured amateur footage of the shooting, which shows an individual entering the building through a window, followed by gunshots. The figure then exits the building and is seen in the courtyard before firing more shots through a first-floor window. After the shots are fired, the lights are turned off.

The first emergency calls were made at 9:04 p.m. First responders arrived at 9:08 p.m., including a specialized armed unit from the Alsterdorf police station, who forced entry into the three-story building one minute later. They encountered the gunman and pursued him to the second floor, where he committed suicide by shooting himself in the stomach at 9:11 p.m. A total of 953 police officers were deployed in the wake of the attack, including 52 Federal Police officers and special forces personnel from Schleswig-Holstein.

== Casualties ==
The casualties included four men and two women, aged 33 to 60, as well as an unborn baby. Eight people were injured, four critically. The injured include the baby's mother, who was seven months pregnant. All six fatalities were German, and the eight injured were six Germans, one Ugandan and one Ukrainian.

== Perpetrator ==
The suspect was later identified as Philipp Fusz, a single man aged 35. On his website, Fusz described himself as a business consultant who grew up in a "strict evangelical household" in Kempten, Bavaria. He was a former member of the Jehovah's Witnesses, had no criminal record, and was not known as an extremist. In 2022, he self-published a book called The Truth About God, Jesus Christ and Satan: A New Reflected View of Epochal Dimensions. In it, he claims to have had prophetic dreams, to have visited hell for three years and to have had an "angelic audience" and "angelic fans". It interpreted the Russian invasion of Ukraine as God's cleansing of Ukrainian sex workers.

Fusz held a gun permit and permission to keep his P30. In January 2023, police had received an anonymous letter saying he had "particular anger against religious members or against the Jehovah's Witnesses and his former employer", but after interviewing him on 7 February, found no legal reason to cancel the permit or confiscate the gun.

According to Arnold Keller, the spokesperson for the Hamburg prosecutor's office, considering the past history of Philipp F. and the Jehovah's Witnesses, it is not possible to completely rule out the possibility that the perpetrator acted out of animosity towards this particular community. However, it is unclear if this was the definitive motive for the crime. On the other hand, a political reason has been ruled out by officials.

== Reactions ==
On the advice of the security authorities, the Hamburg congregations of Jehovah's Witnesses began conducting their services digitally.

On their website, the Jehovah's Witnesses expressed their "deep sorrow" about the fatal shooting. A funeral service was held on 25 March 2023 and was attended by up to 4,000 members of the faith community, including 50 Hamburg congregants, relatives and survivors, as well as representatives of the Jehovah's Witnesses' World Headquarters and the Central Europe branch. Representatives from politics and the authorities, including Mayor Peter Tschentscher, had also been invited.

The Catholic and Protestant churches expressed their sympathy. On 19 March 2023, the Archdiocese of Hamburg, the Evangelical Lutheran Church in Northern Germany and the Working Group of Christian Churches in Hamburg held an ecumenical memorial service in the main Protestant Church of Saint Peter. Representatives of Jehovah's Witnesses supported the commemoration but did not take part themselves.

== See also ==
- List of mass shootings in Germany
- Hanau shootings
- 2023 Kerala bombing – October 2023 attack against Jehovah's Witnesses in India
