= Murder of Ella Bennett =

2007 child murder in Abilene, Texas

- Location: Abilene, Texas, U.S.
- Date: February 4, 2007; 19 years ago c. 11:30 p.m. (CST)
- Attack type: Child murder, stabbing, strangulation, sororicide
- Weapon: Knife
- Victims: Ella Bennett, aged 4
- Perpetrator: Paris Lee Bennett
- Motive: Revenge against his mother
- Verdict: Pleaded guilty
- Convictions: Capital murder
- Sentence: 40 years in prison (parole after 20 years)

On February 4, 2007, 13-year-old Paris Lee Bennett murdered his 4-year-old sister, Ella Bennett, in Abilene, Texas. Paris stabbed Ella 17 times.

The motive for the murder was Paris's resentment towards his mother, Charity Bennett, as he believed the most effective way to emotionally damage her was to take away one of her children.

Paris pleaded guilty in juvenile court to capital murder, and was given the maximum sentence of 40 years in prison, with the possibility of parole after 20 years. Following the murder, Paris was evaluated and met criteria for conduct disorder.

The murder has gained extensive attention due to its circumstances, as well as the ages of both the perpetrator and the victim.

== Background ==
Charity Bennett, the mother of Paris and Ella Bennett, was Kyla Claar Bennett's daughter. Kyla Bennett was charged with conspiring to murder her husband and Charity's father, James Robert Bennett Jr. She was controversially found not guilty, and Charity believes her mother was actually guilty. Kyla later joked in a documentary about "manipulating" the jury. During her childhood, Charity became addicted to drugs in an attempt to gain attention from her mother, but Kyla never showed any interest.

== Murder ==
Shortly before the murder, Charity had relapsed into drug addiction. This was believed to be Paris's breaking point, making him decide to murder Ella. However, Paris displayed warning signs of violence before the murder and has since admitted to feeling homicidal tendencies since he was a young child.

On February 4, 2007, Charity hired a babysitter; she had to work late at her job at the Buffalo Wild Wings restaurant because it was the night of the 2007 Super Bowl. Around 10:00 PM, Paris manipulated the babysitter and convinced her to go home for the night. According to Charity's memoir, “How Now, Butterfly?: A Memoir of Murder, Survival & Transformation” (WildBlue Press), Paris spent hours watching violent pornography like bondage and sadism, and searched for "snuff films" before murdering Ella.

Later that night, sometime before 11:30 PM, Paris entered Ella's room and stabbed her 17 times. Following the murder, he called a school friend for about six minutes before deciding to call 9-1-1 at 11:42 PM. On the call, Paris appeared to fake insanity, telling the dispatcher that he thought Ella was a demon and stabbed her. The dispatcher instructed Paris to perform CPR. Instead, he pretended he was by counting along with the dispatcher as he paced around the room. Paris was later arrested sometime before 12:30 AM.

Semen was found in the underwear Paris was wearing during the murder, indicating that he became sexually aroused by the murder. Writing in her memoir, Charity shared that Paris had sexually abused Ella that night, and the more violent he got, the more aroused he became, ending in her death and his climax. Authorities also found his semen on Ella and the bed where she was murdered.[1]

== Legal proceedings ==
Following his arrest, Paris was charged with the capital murder of Ella. Paris was not charged as an adult, since the minimum age a juvenile can be tried as an adult in Texas is 14. He was instead charged in juvenile court and pleaded guilty to capital murder. He was sentenced to 40 years in prison with the possibility of parole after 20 years, which is the maximum sentence for a defendant convicted of capital murder in juvenile court in Texas. When he was 19, Paris was transferred to adult prison.

During proceedings, further assessment using standardized measures documented significant psychopathic traits. He said he's had homicidal ideation since he was a child. Paris will first be eligible for parole in February 2027. If he is never granted parole he will be released in February 2047, when he will be 53 years of age.

== Aftermath ==
Charity initially maintained contact with Paris after the murder, which Paris said astounded him. Charity has been told that she and her new son are at risk once Paris is released, which she accepts. She has acknowledged that she will most likely need to move to a new location once Paris is released. Experts have said that it is unlikely that Paris could ever be rehabilitated.

In 2017, a documentary titled The Family I Had was released about the case; it focused on Charity's life of being the daughter of a murder suspect (Kyla), and the mother of both a murderer (Paris) and a murder victim (Ella).

In 2019, Paris Bennett made headlines when he gave an interview to broadcaster Piers Morgan.

In 2021, Charity stated that she had ceased all communication with Paris after learning he was involved with a woman who was on bond two hours away from where she lived for planning a mass shooting. She stated, "I finally accepted it is okay to love him as my son but really dislike the man he has become."

In 2026, Investigation Discovery aired the episode "The Child I Thought I Knew" on their series Evil Lives Here: My Child The Killer.
