= 2023 Kerala bombing =

IED attack in India

Kalamassery Convention Centre Blast
- 2023 Kerala bombing (Kerala) 2023 Kerala bombing (India)
- Location: 10°03′32″N 76°21′34″E; Zamra International Convention & Exhibition Centre, Kalamassery, Kerala, India
- Date: 29 October 2023; 9:40 AM (GMT +5:30)
- Target: Jehovah's Witnesses Convention
- Attack type: Bombing
- Weapon: Improvised explosive device
- Deaths: 8
- Injuries: 50+
- Perpetrator: Dominic Martin
- Motive: Indian ultra-nationalism

On 29 October 2023, a series of improvised explosive device (IED) blasts took place during a convention of Jehovah's Witnesses in Kalamassery, a suburb of Kochi, India. Five women, two men, and a child were killed and more than fifty other people were injured when the group was holding a Sunday morning session of their annual regional convention in southern India's Kerala state. A man shortly surrendered at the Kodakara police station, claiming to be responsible for the blast. The motive of the blast is still under investigation.

== Incident ==
On the morning of 29 October 2023, the final day of a three-day programme, about 2500 members of Jehovah's Witnesses had gathered at the Zamra International Convention & Exhibition Centre, Kalamassery, Kerala, South India. The blasts occurred at 9:40 AM and fire was reported in the building located 10 km northeast of Kochi city. Witnesses say that there were multiple explosions, and that the hall was filled with smoke and fire. People rushed out of the centre in panic, and some were injured in the stampede. The first victim was found charred to death in the middle of the hall. The injured were taken to nearby hospitals, and several were in critical condition.

== Victims ==
As of 7 December 2023, eight people have died as a result of the explosion, with three victims belonging to the same family. The first reported fatality was Leona Paulos, a 55-year-old woman who was found charred to death at the blast spot. A few hours later, Kumari Pushpan, a resident of Thodupuzha, died in the hospital. On the next day, 12-year-old Libna, whose burns were 95%, succumbed to her injuries. More than 50 others suffered burn injuries due to fire. 17 people had been admitted to different hospitals, 12 of whom were in intensive care with burns above 50-60%. A week later, 61-year-old Molly Joy and 45-year-old Reena "Sally" Pradeepan, who is also Libna's mother, died while in intensive care. The sixth victim was Praveen Pradeepan, older brother of Libna and son of Reena, both of whom had died as a result of their injuries following the blast. Seventh victim, 78-year-old K.V. John, was undergoing treatment for injuries in the blast and died on 2 December 2023 and his wife Lilly John, 71, a retired bank employee, was the eighth victim who died on 7 December 2023.

== Suspect ==
=== Dominic Martin ===
Dominic Martin, a 57-year-old resident of Thammanam who claims to be a renegade member of the Jehovah's Witnesses, surrendered at a police station in Kodakara and confessed that he is behind the blast. Prior to surrendering, he posted a video on Facebook where he was seen saying that he resented the Witnesses' "anti-national" doctrines. Police were suspicious of Martin's claim, and took him to custody for further questioning.

=== Confession ===
As per the suspect's own confession, he planned the blast when he was working in Dubai. Martin told the police that he used 8 L (2.1 U.S. gal) of petrol and high-impact firecrackers to make the bomb. Electronic components required for detonating the bomb were purchased from Ernakulam on the pretext of making remote control toys for children.

== Investigation ==
Initially, it was speculated that some Islamist terrorist groups might be behind the blasts and the incident was connected to the ongoing Israeli–Palestinian conflict. Initial interrogation of the accused by police have thought that this was likely an insider attack but later developments proved that the accused had foreign links. Preliminary investigation indicated that an IED placed inside a tiffin box might have caused the blasts. Police also recovered four remote control devices from the storage space of Martin's scooter which he parked at the Kodakara police station before surrender.

=== Interpol assistance ===
In early 2025, the case had a significant turn with investigators uncovering foreign connections linked to the accused, Dominic Martin. According to sources, the accused had sent images of the bomb he allegedly prepared to three foreign phone numbers. Following this findings, authorities sought Interpol’s assistance to further the probe. The accused had spent a long time in Dubai, but due to legal restrictions, a detailed investigation did not take place there. With the state government's approval, Kerala Police’s Interpol liaison officer, Crime Branch IG, is now authorized to engage with UAE authorities, pending central government clearance. The investigation will focus on the accused’s activities and personal connections in Dubai. Officials believe this could provide crucial insights into the case, and any additional evidence uncovered may be presented in court. The chargesheet in the case was filed in April 2024, but authorities continue to probe possible external influences and motives behind the attack.

== Response ==
According to the Kerala Director General of Police Shaik Darvesh Saheb, preliminary investigation indicated that an improvised explosive device was utilized. The Kerala government put the state on high alert after the blasts. Police and security forces have been deployed in sensitive areas, and checks are being carried out at all entry and exit points to the state.

The National Security Guard, India's national counter-terrorism unit, moved one of its bomb disposal units from New Delhi to Kerala in order to conduct an investigation and collected evidence from the blast site.

The National Investigation Agency (NIA) has taken over the investigation into the blasts. The NIA is India's premier counter-terrorism agency, and it is investigating the possibility that the blasts were carried out by a terrorist group.

Shortly after the bombing occurred, false claims that it was linked to the Gaza war spread on social media.

== See also ==
- List of terrorist incidents in India
- 2023 Hamburg shooting – March 2023 attack against Jehovah's Witnesses in Germany
