= 2017 Konstanz shooting =

2017 murder and mass shooting in Konstanz, Germany

- 2017 Konstanz shooting (Germany)
- Location: 47°40′N 9°11′E; Gray Nightclub, Max-Stromeyer-Strasse, Konstanz, Germany
- Date: 30 July 2017; 9 years ago c. 4.30 a.m. – 5:00 a.m. (CET, UTC+01:00)
- Attack type: Mass shooting
- Weapon: M16 rifle
- Deaths: 2 (including the perpetrator)
- Injuries: 5
- Perpetrator: Rozaba Sendi

On 30 July 2017, a mass shooting occurred at Gray Nightclub in Konstanz, Germany. The shooter killed one adult and injured four others, two seriously. Another man was reportedly injured when attempting to stop the shooter with a metal bar. The shooter died of his wounds after being shot by police. The shooter was a relative of the nightclub owner and was involved in a family feud.

== Shooting ==
The shooting occurred at 4:30am at the recently opened Gray Nightclub, on Max-Stromeyer-Strasse in Konstanz's industrial zone. Following a dispute with a family member, the gunman left the club to get his illegal automatic M16 rifle. He returned after hijacking a taxi and holding the driver at gunpoint, however the driver was able to alert the police.

Upon arriving at the club the gunman shot two doormen who had refused him entry, killing one. The second doorman was shot six times but survived. The gunman briefly entered the club sparking an evacuation but then returned outside. The police arrived and returned fire, a policeman was severely injured in the exchange and two patrons were shot in the crossfire, although one did not immediately notice.

== Perpetrator ==
The gunman, Rozaba Sendi, 34, was an Iraqi-Kurdish citizen who had lived in Germany since childhood. He had a history of drug offences and assault. He was the son-in-law of the club's owner.

== See also ==
- List of mass shootings in Germany
