= Lodelinsart =

Lodelinsart Lodlinsåt (Walloon)
- Former municipality of Belgium
- Location in the municipality of Charleroi

- Location in Belgium
- Coordinates: 50°25′N 4°27′E
- Country: Belgium
- Region: Wallonia
- Community: French Community
- Province: Hainaut
- Municipality: Charleroi

Area
  - Total: 1.14 sq mi (2.96 km^{2})

Population (2001)
  - Total: 6,802
- Time zone: UTC+1 (CET)
  - Summer (DST): UTC+2 (CEST)
- Postal code: 6042
- Area code: 071

Lodelinsart (Walloon: Lodlinsåt) is a town of Wallonia and a district of the municipality of Charleroi, located in the province of Hainaut, Belgium.

It was a municipality of its own before the fusion of the Belgian municipalities in 1977.

== Folklore ==
The Royal Climbia's Club is a philanthropic club founded in 1893 in Lodelinsart. The club is made up of thirteen local men and many volunteers who work with them for charity. The Climbia's organise a masked ball and various festive events. The Royal Cimbia's club is part of the oral and intangible heritage of the Brussels-Wallonia Federation.

== Crime ==
Sadia Sheikh was murdered in Lodelinsart in 2007.
