= Faruk Şen =

Turkish economist (1948–2025)

Faruk Şen (born 21 April 1948, in Ankara; died 25 January 2025, in Istanbul) was a Turkish-German university professor. From 1985 to 2008, he was the director of the Centre for Turkish Studies and Integration Research.

== Life ==
Şen studied business administration at the University of Münster from 1971. After receiving his doctorate in 1979, he became head of the "Measures for Vocational Preparation and Social Integration of Young Foreigners (MBSE)" at the adult education center in Duisburg in 1981, and from 1983 managing director of the pilot project "Teacher Training in the School/Work Transition." In 1985, he founded the Center for Turkish Studies and Integration Research (ZfT), of which he became director. In 1990, he was appointed professor at the then University of Duisburg-Essen. On 3 July 2008, Şen was suspended as director of the ZfT. Following criticism of him after he compared the situation of Turkish migrants in Germany to the persecution of Jews during the Nazi era, Şen officially resigned from his position in July 2008 by mutual agreement with the state of North Rhine-Westphalia, effective at the end of 2008.

Şen was a long-time resident of Kanlıca, Istanbul. In 1993, he married psychiatrist and Dost Beykoz writer İnci Şen, originally from İzmir. That same year, he joined the Social Democratic Party of Germany (SPD). His relationship with the party became strained in 2004, when he was found on the supporter list of Christian Democratic Union (CDU) politician Oliver Wittke during the Gelsenkirchen mayoral election, which SPD politician Frank Baranowski ultimately won. Şen was subject to official party expulsion proceedings, but he remained a member as of 2008.

Şen died on 25 January 2025 following long-term illness with cancer. He was buried on 27 January at Kanlıca Cemetery in Beykoz.

== Controversy surrounding the Armenian genocide ==
On 9 March 2006, in a radio interview, a few days before a demonstration by Turkish nationalists against the German Bundestag's resolution on Armenians, Şen expressed the opinion that the Armenian genocide of 1915 was not a genocide, stating "That means the term we use for Germany is not correct for the Ottoman Empire. Therefore, I would say that genocide according to this definition is incorrect." He was subsequently sharply criticized by Monika Düker, the domestic policy spokesperson for the Greens in the Landtag of North Rhine-Westphalia, as well as by the historians Wolfgang Benz and Medardus Brehl, who argued that Şen’s categorical rejection of the term “genocide” in relation to the Armenian genocide in no way reflected the current debate (Düker), that Şen’s statement was unscientific and mere agitation and propaganda (Benz), and that, contrary to Şen’s account, the Armenian genocide could be proven both historically and legally. Lasse (Brehl). Şen has never publicly commented on the criticism.

== Awards ==
- German-Turkish Friendship Prize Munich 2005
- Order of Merit of the State of North Rhine-Westphalia 1997
- Federal Cross of Merit 2003

== Selected works ==
- Faruk Sen: Establishment, Structure and Economic Function of Turkish Employee Companies in the Federal Republic of Germany for the Socioeconomic Situation of Turkey. – Münster, 1980. – Dissertation: Münster (Westphalia), University, Faculty of Economics and Social Sciences
- Faruk Sen and Sinan Özel: Effects of Turkey's Full Membership on the EU Budget 2004–2006. – Essen: Center for Turkish Studies Foundation, 2004. -(zft-aktuell ; 104)
- Faruk Sen, Martina Sauer and Dirk Halm: Euro-Islam: A Religion Establishes Itself in Europe; Status, Perspectives, Challenges. – Essen: Center for Turkish Studies Foundation, 2004. – (zft-aktuell; 102)
- Faruk Sen: The New Jews of Europe, editorial in the Turkish business newspaper 'Referans' from May 19, 2008
