= Athénée Royal Vauban =

School in Charleroi, Belgium

Coordinates: 50.4118°N 4.4474°E

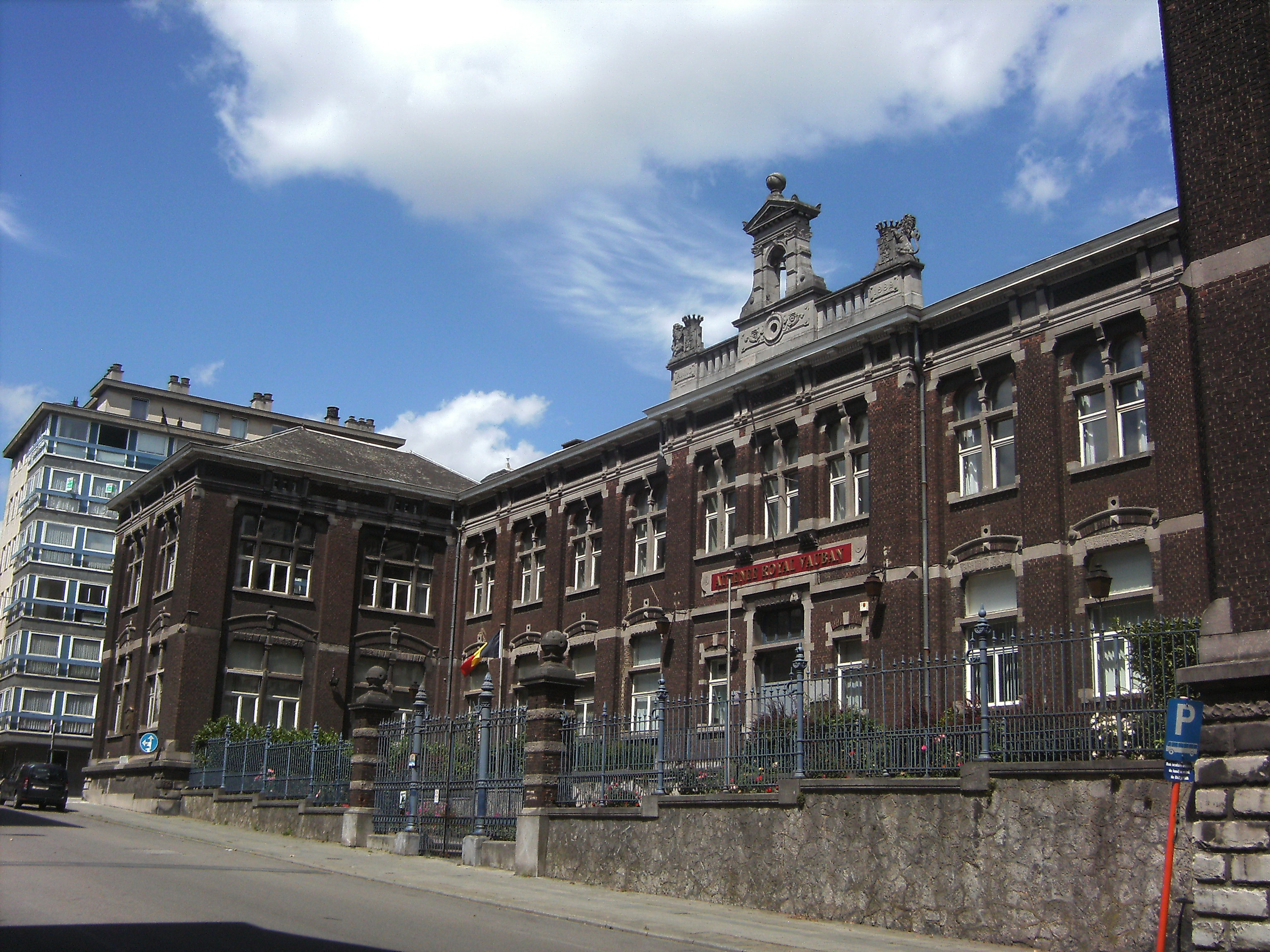
Main facade of the school.

Athénée Royal Vauban is a Francophone secondary school in Charleroi, Belgium.

For much of its history it was a school for girls, originating from a private school opened by Mrs Dupuis in 1831. The royal decree of 26 Septembre 1881 created a state school for girls, Ecole Moyenne de l'Etat pour Demoiselles. It was officially designated a Royal Antheneum as per the Decree of the Regent of 27 August 1947. The preparatory section began having coeducational education in 1974, with coeducation affecting other portions by 1979. That year the school was renovated.
