= 2012 Karlsruhe murders =

Hostage-taking and mass murder in Karlsruhe, Germany

- Karlsruhe (Baden-Württemberg) Karlsruhe (Germany)
- Location: Kanalweg 115; Karlsruhe, Baden-Württemberg, Germany
- Date: 4 July 2012 c. 8:10 – 11:48
- Attack type: Shooting, hostage-taking, arson, mass murder, murder-suicide
- Weapons: .45 Colt handgun Shotgun
- Deaths: 5 (including the perpetrator)
- Perpetrator: Bernard Klotz

On 4 July 2012, a hostage-taking and subsequent mass murder took place in Karlsruhe, Baden-Württemberg, Germany. A tenant was subject to an eviction and held four people hostage. He fatally wounded one of the hostages, released one hostage and killed the remaining two. After a three-hour stand-off with police, the perpetrator set a fire in the flat and killed himself. Before the hostage crisis, the perpetrator had murdered his girlfriend, the legal tenant, in their shared bedroom.

The victims were a 33-year-old locksmith, a 47-year-old bailiff, a 49-year-old man who had bought the flat and the perpetrator's 55-year-old girlfriend. The 53-year-old perpetrator had lived in the apartment for 15 years and was known as a gun hoarder. He had planned the act ahead of the scheduled eviction.

== Background ==
There have been several instances of gun violence during forced evictions in Germany, dating back to at least the late 1990s. The perpetrators were most often single, middle-aged to elderly, and long-time residents of the properties. Cases included 1997 in Breitscheid (48-year-old gunman; 1 killed), 2009 in Schwalmtal (71-year-old gunman; 3 killed, 1 injured), and 2011 in Rastatt (63-year-old gunman; 1 killed).

=== Events leading up to eviction ===
The flat where the crime occurred was court auctioned on 25 April 2012. The tenant, Karin W., had lived in the apartment for 15 years with her partner Bernard Klotz. The cause for the auction was initially a debt of 1,881 euro to the property management, which the tenant Karin W. did not pay. A subsequent investigation indicated that W. had likely committed evasion of health insurance contribution payments to DAK-Gesundheit, numbering €70,000. The property was valued at €152,000 and was purchased by a private buyer at €150,000. Including paid debt and the costs of the court auction W. was to receive €60,000. She was to be relocated to a halfway house while Klotz would have been left homeless. Karin W. never appeared to officials, did not respond to phone calls or e-mails, nor did she allow any city workers to enter the apartment.

== Killings ==
At few hours before the hostage-taking, Bernard Klotz killed his girlfriend Karin W. with a gunshot to the chest as she laid in bed.

At around 8:00, four repo vans arrived at the address in Nordstadt. Three workers associated with the eviction, consisting of a bailiff, a locksmith and a social worker, went to the fifth floor and were picking the lock when the door was opened from inside. Klotz excused his girlfriend's absence by claiming she was ill and taking bedrest. He asked the workers to sit on the couch and wait, but the men refused, saying the wanted to continue with the eviction as planned. During the argument, Uwe S., the new owner of the flat, who had ordered the eviction to move into the attic apartment with his wife, also arrived.

Shortly after, Klotz. pulled out a pistol and held the men at gunpoint. When bailiff Wolfgang Person attempted to calm the tenant down, he was shot twice in the thigh. Locksmith Mustafa Güler was forced at gunpoint to tie up the others with zipties. Afterwards, Güler attempted to grab the gun to disarm the hostage-taker, but was instead fatally wounded with five gunshots to the chest and head.

The tenant paced the flat for several minutes, smoking and drinking beer while the social worker, Thomas Wydolski, pleaded for their captor to reconsider and reminded him of previous calls about the eviction made in advance. At 8:53, he agreed to let Wydolski go, but before doing so, he showed him his ammunition stock and arsenal of weapons, consisting of a shotgun, a Kalashnikov rifle with an extended magazine, two more handguns and two dummy grenades used for training purposes. The worker heard three gunshots while descending the building's staircase, believed to have been the moment the tenant killed the remaining hostages with gunshots to the back of the head. The social worker immediately called police upon leaving the flat.

200 officers were involved in the stand-off. Roads, walkways and schools in a 500-metre radius were temporarily shut down. All attempts at negotiation with the hostage-taker failed. Klotz lit the carpet on fire, moved into the bedroom, and shot himself in the head with the shotgun. SEK stormed the premises at 11:48 when smoke could be seen rising from the window and discovered all involved parties dead. Another revolver was found in the flat while a search of the basement found a weapons cabinet with two additional shotguns and assorted ammunition. The grenades were discovered to be inert as one was found mostly melted to the carpet.

== Perpetrator ==
Bernard Klotz was a French national who had spent the majority of his life in Alsace. He was born in Bas-Rhin department and lived in Soufflenheim, approximately 35 kilometers to the west of Karlsruhe. Klotz had worked as a construction foreman and caregiver, having met his girlfriend Karin W. while taking care of her paraplegic brother. He moved to Karlsruhe with W. in 2001 and sold his house in Soufflenheim in 2005, but was still registered as a resident to the commune. Karlsruhe city administrators were unaware of Klotz's presence, despite his name being on the flat's post box.

Klotz was known to own several guns while residing in France. Between 1996 and 2000, the government office in Haguenau recorded six registrations for Category C firearms, exclusively rifles for hunting purposes. Between 1997 and 2000, Klotz was part of a Schützenverein in Betschdorf between 1997 and 2000. The club's president said that he didn't attend very often and did not socialise with other members. After leaving, Klotz sold his club firearms, a .22 LR rifle and a Smith & Wesson handgun, in accordance with regulations. His family said that Klotz kept a stocked weapon cabinet in his home afterwards. With the exception of the shotguns, the weapons in his possession had not been legally obtained and none of the long rifles had been legally declared upon his immigration.

Upon relocating to Germany, Klotz was unemployed for several years. Contrary to initial reports, he was not on unemployment benefits, but lived off of a sizable inheritance from his mother, which was left in his name alone despite having ten older half-siblings. He had recently accrued a massive gambling debt while using slot machines, but remained financially stable. Klotz had one prior conviction for theft, when he shoplifted 30 euro worth of cosmetics, with a knife and brass knuckle being found on his person.

== Aftermath ==
The fact that the perpetrator had been a former sports shooter contributed to the ongoing gun control debate in Germany, as previous mass killings such as the Erfurt and Winnenden school shootings had also been committed with sports shooting guns. A proposed ban was ultimately rejected by the Karlsruhe Regional Court in February 2013.

Two weeks after the killings, residents donated €108,000 to a condolence book at the city hall, set up by then-mayor Heinz Fenrich. By July 2013 a total of €183,000 had been donated, the largest single donor providing €9,000.

Colleagues of the murdered bailiff received psychological trauma counselling. Baden-Württemberg authorities sought to implement more security measures for state employees and now listed "unresponsive evictions" ("nachrichtenlose Räumungen") as posing a potential danger, allowing bailiffs to contact police to accompany them or provide more information about the tenant, such as criminal record, existent weapons licences or reports of unregistered cohabitants. In the year following the murders, the concept was only used once, in a case where the apartment turned out to be empty. President of Amtsgericht Karlsruhe Jörg Müller stated that in the majority of evictions, tenants usually leave their abode at will before the arrival of local officialls, hence why notifications via mail or phone often go unanswered.

In 2013, on the one-year anniversary of the murders, mayor Frank Mentrup ordered flags to be put on half-mast citywide.
