= Deniz Kurku =

German politician (born 1982)

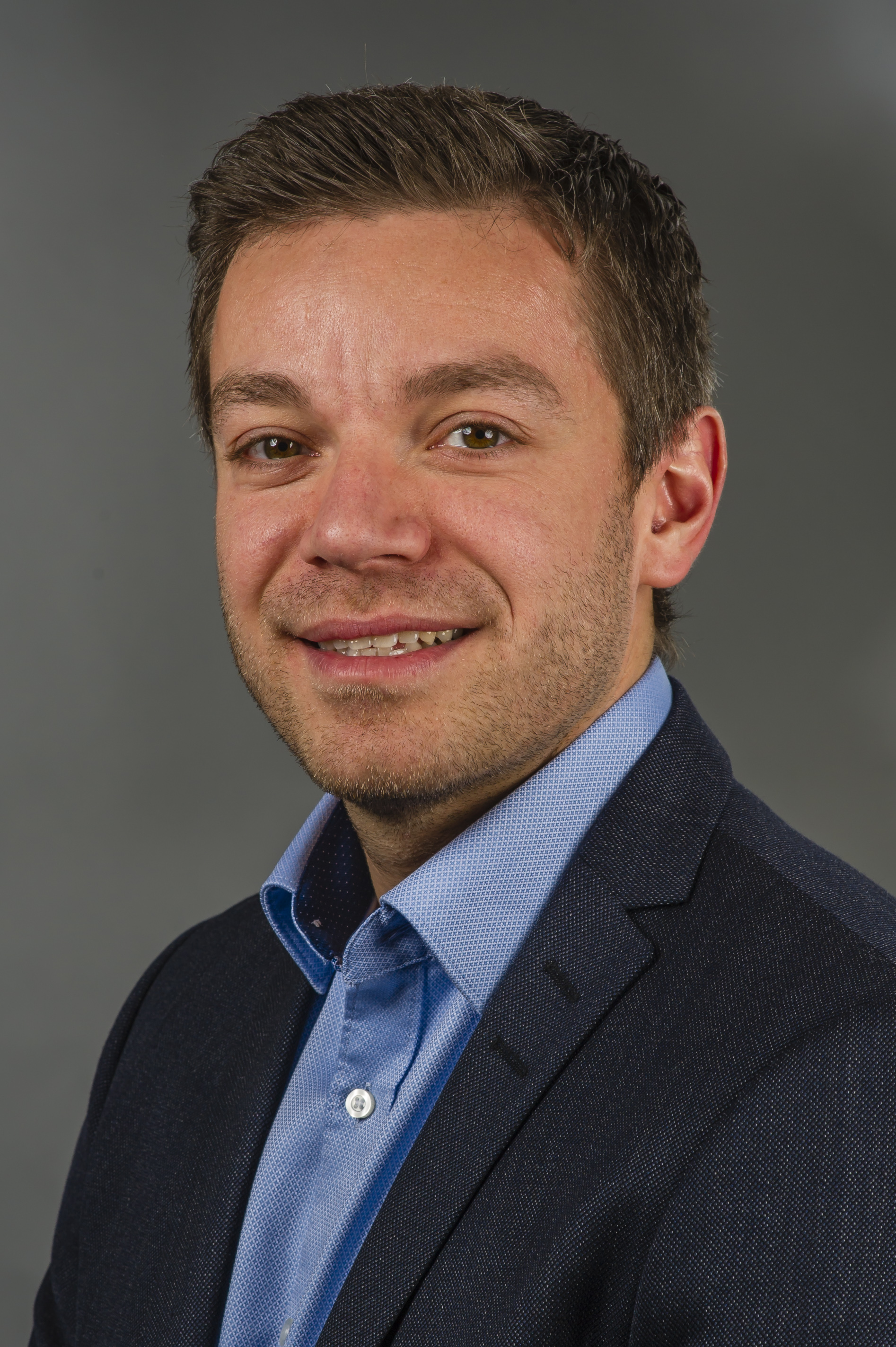
- Kurku in 2018

Member of the Landtag of Lower Saxony
- Incumbent
- Assumed office 14 November 2017
- Preceded by: Annette Schwarz
- Constituency: Delmenhorst

Personal details
- Born: 8 August 1982 (age 43)
- Party: Social Democratic Party (since 2002)

Deniz Kurku (born 8 August 1982) is a German politician serving as a member of the Landtag of Lower Saxony since 2017. He has served as commissioner for migration and participation of Lower Saxony since 2022.
