= 1999 Dillingen shootings =

Mass shooting in Saarland, Germany, and Moselle, France

- Location: Dillingen, Saarland, Germany and Sierck-les-Bains, Moselle, France
- Date: 16 May 1999; 4:40 a.m. – 5:40 a.m.
- Weapons: CZ 75 pistol (9mm); Smith & Wesson revolver (.357 Magnum)
- Deaths: 6 (including the perpetrator)
- Injuries: 11
- Perpetrator: Günter Ewen
- Motive: Personal disputes, robbery

On 16 May 1999, a spree shooting took place in Dillingen, Saarland, Germany, and continued in nearby Sierck-les-Bains, Moselle, France. Five people were killed and eleven were injured before the perpetrator, 36-year-old sex offender Günter Ewen, fled the scene. Following a two-day manhunt, Ewen committed suicide to evade arrest while hiding in Luxembourg.

== Shootings ==
In the early morning hours of 16 May 1999, Günter Ewen was denied entry into the Xanadu discothèque in central Dillingen, where the annual Schnuppertage Volksfest was being held. Ewen did not have money to pay the entry fee and following an argument with the doorman, Ewen left and broke into a friend's house. Inside, he stole two handguns owned by the occupant for sports shooting, though this has also been misreported as a shotgun. Returning to the nightclub at around 4:40 a.m., Ewen immediately opened fire, killing the doorman and the owner of the nightclub, as well as injuring eight customers. At the time, there were about 20 customers inside the club. The doorman initially survived, but died of his injuries at Universitätsklinikum des Saarlandes. Ewen was reportedly acquainted with both killed men.

Ewen ran 200 metres away to the flat of French national Robert Fisne, a police informant who had testified against Ewen in a theft trial earlier in the year. Inside, at around 5:10, Ewen shot Fisne, his British wife and their 11-year-old daughter as the three slept in bed together. The parents were killed while their daughter, who was lying between both, survived with heavy injuries after being wounded in the face. Ewen fled the city in his sister's car, crossing into France. In Sierck-les-Bains, Ewen broke into a home, killing a 39-year-old man, presumably after he resisted an attempt at robbery for money or his car. On the street, outside of a retirement home, Ewen shot and injured a nurse during a carjacking, stealing the woman's Renault. He crashed the car at a vacant army bureaux, sustaining light injuries and leaving the pistol behind. He forced the driver of another car, a Peugeot 106, out of the vehicle, during which Ewen injured an intervening off-duty fire fighter, who was grazed in the ear. Ewen left the second car near Montenach, fleeing into Luxembourg on foot, where he boarded a taxi to Strassen, still armed with the revolver.

=== Manhunt ===
Police were alerted to gunshots near Sierck, which were connected to the shootings in Dillingen. Officers found the first car outside the military barracks, which were unsuccessfully searched for Ewen's presence. This resulted in a manhunt which involved police blocking off roads and using helicopters to look for him. In total, 100 officers of Moselle Gendarmerie and 80 officers of Saarland Police participated in the search. French officers searched the area around the Moselle river with dogs, also wearing bulletproof vests. During the two day search, the second stolen car was found, but no trace of Ewen was recovered, with police noting that there were no reports of car thefts or violent attacks in the same timeframe. Police received 110 hints, including 60 phone calls, from the public regarding Ewen's possible whereabouts. The program of the Fête de la Grenouille in the neighbouring villages was slightly modified due to the manhunt.

Investigators initially assumed that Ewen had targeted former criminal acquaintances during the initial shootings in Dillingen. Only criminal activity by Robert Fisne could be confirmed, though there was also speculation whether Robert's wife Joey, who worked as a night bar hostess, may have also had interactions with Ewen.

On 18 May, at about 13:00, police tracked down Ewen at the Mon Plaisier hotel in Strassen, after a receptionist reported a suspicious guest in dirty clothes who had entered without luggage, later recognising him from a photograph in the newspaper. At 15:40, as officers broke down the barricaded door to his room, Ewen killed himself with a gunshot to the head with his revolver.

=== Victims ===
- Roland Dekow, 41 or 42, manager of "Xanadu"-discothèque
- Unknown, 40, doorman at "Xanadu"-discothèque
- Robert Fisne, 37 or 41
- Joey Fisne (also Shonette/Shonnette Maxine Fisne), 37 or 39, wife of Robert Fisne
- Étienne K. (or Ernest Kuster), 39

== Perpetrator ==
Mugshot of Günter Ewen used in the manhunt

Günter Hermann Ewen was born in Dillingen in 1962, being the youngest and only boy among five siblings, and suffered from asthma from childhood. He showed little interest at school, had to repeat two grades and left Hauptschule after grade seven, whereupon he started an apprenticeship as a paver, which he quit after two years due to his ailment. Up to the age of 30 he lived with his parents and mostly worked odd jobs to earn money.

=== Prior criminal history ===
According to conflicting reports Ewen began to consume alcohol excessively either at the age of twelve or eighteen, at the encouragement of the boyfriend of one of his sisters. As a youth he was arrested for theft, fraud, and battery. In 1982 he was caught numerous times while driving under the influence of alcohol, which resulted in a three-month prison term when he was 26. Between 1990 and 1991, he was arrested for acts of voyeurism and exhibitionism, which resulted in a fine after he was caught masturbating in front of several women. Six months later Ewen, whilst drunk, twice broke into a home for mentally disabled women and sexually molested them in their beds. The same night, after the attack, he raped a woman in her home. In February 1993 Ewen was convicted of rape and sexual assault in three cases, and sentenced to a prison term of five years and six months. A psychologist found him to be a narcissist. In prison he was in therapy concerning his sex offences and was released on parole in October 1996. He subsequently worked as a self-employed construction contractor.

In August 1998 he was accused by his friend Robert Fisne of six counts of burglary, whereupon he was again arrested. He remained in remand until 24 January 1999, when he was acquitted, since no incriminating evidence could be found and the testimony of Fisne, the only witness in the case, was vague and contradictory. While he was jailed, Ewen's construction business went bankrupt, he lost his home, his girlfriend left him, and he had accumulated DM 60,000 in debt, while the DM 3,000 granted as compensation for his wrongful imprisonment were barely enough to pay his attorney. Ewen's last residence was at the home of his sister and brother-in-law in Beckingen.

== Aftermath ==
Günter Ewen's body was returned to Germany and buried in an unmarked grave in Dillingen. The injured Fisne daughter was given into the custody of relatives in England following psychological care. Dillingen's fencing club, which the girl was a member of, raised several thousand DM in her name.

In March 2025, the shootings were the subject of an episode of the Tatort Saarland podcast of Saarbrücker Zeitung.
