= Bad Reichenhall shooting =

1999 mass shooting in Bad Reichenhall, Germany

- Bad Reichenhall (Bavaria) Bad Reichenhall (Germany)
- Location: Bad Reichenhall, Bavaria, Germany
- Date: 1 November 1999 c.12:00 – c.12:45 (CET)
- Attack type: Mass shooting, murder-suicide, sororicide
- Weapons: .223 Remington Ruger Mini-14 with scope; Colt Python; Henry double barrel shotgun (shooter's suicide); .44-40 Winchester Model 1866 (unused)
- Deaths: 5 (including the perpetrator)
- Injuries: 7
- Perpetrator: Martin Peyerl

On 1 November 1999, a mass shooting took place in Bad Reichenhall, Bavaria, Germany. The 16-year-old perpetrator Martin Peyerl killed four people and wounded seven others in his home and outside two windows before committing suicide.

== Shooting ==
=== Preparation & sister's murder ===
On 1 November 1999, Peyerl's parents left the house to visit the grave of one of Peyerl's grandparents in Piding, something they typically did on All Saints' Day. Martin did not go with them. In the absence of his parents, Martin Peyerl broke into his father's gun cabinet where he stole four firearms: a scoped Ruger Mini-14, a double-barrelled shotgun, a Colt Python and a Winchester M1866. Peyerl first shot his 18-year-old sister Daniela, who had just arrived home from her job as a child care worker at the hospital, twice in the head, once in the chest and once in the arm. Police later found evidence of a struggle that occurred between the two shortly before Peyerl shot her. He then barricaded himself in his parents’ bedroom.

=== Bedroom window shootings ===
Shortly before midday Peyerl opened fire at nearby people outside two windows in his parents' bedroom with the Mini-14 and the Colt Python. Neighbors 59-year-old Ruth Zillenbiller and 60-year-old Horst Zillenbiller were killed with ten gunshots while 54-year-old Karl-Heinz Lietz, a patient at the hospital across the street who had stepped outside to smoke, died the following day after being shot once in the head. Seven others were ultimately wounded, among them actor Günter Lamprecht, who was shot twice with the revolver, once in the arm, his partner Claudia Amm and their chauffeur, who were driving to the hospital. He then fatally shot the family cat, sat down in a bathtub, and committed suicide with a single blast from a shotgun to the head. Within 45 minutes, a total of 50 gunshots were fired.

=== Emergency response ===
Police cordoned off the area and did not attempt to go near the house from which the shots were fired. It was initially thought that the gunman was Peyerl's father before the latter showed up outside police barriers. With the arrival of a SEK team, police stormed the house at 18:00, finding the bodies of Daniela and Martin Peyerl along with the cat. An enormous swastika was painted above Peyerl's bed; in his room were a number of additional painted swastikas and other Nazi symbols. A number of videos and CDs with violent content were also discovered. A portrait of Adolf Hitler hung above the bed of Peyerl's sister.

== Perpetrator ==
Martin Peyerl was born to Rudolf and Theresa Peyerl on 11 August 1983, as the younger of two children. He lived with parents on Riedelstraße 12 in Bad Reichenhall.

No clear motive has been presented for Peyerl's actions. Peyerl was an outsider at school and had an alcoholic father at home who was frequently unemployed. He was an avid gun enthusiast and frequently purchased gun magazines. He told classmates that he sometimes went to the forest looking for birds "to shoot" and sometimes practiced shooting with his father in the garage. His father Rudolf Peyerl, a twelve-year veteran of the German Army, was himself enthusiastic about firearms, owning as many as nineteen. A few months prior to the shooting, Peyerl was temporarily expelled from school because of Nazi photographs pasted in his notebook. He was attending apprenticeship as a locksmith.

Peyerl pictured in a class photo

Neighbors said that Peyerl was a normal albeit introverted boy, but a psychiatrist who was involved in this case spoke of a "loser type". He is said to have been a shy loner who preferred playing video games over talking to people. One classmate said "Martin was always nice", but that he was largely ignored and rarely had anything to say. Another said Peyerl was "a bit of a right-winger".

Media argued that Peyerl was possibly influenced by the American mass murderers Eric Harris and Dylan Klebold due to the similarities to the Columbine High School massacre that occurred in the same year. Descriptions by Peyerl's classmates drew comparisons to those given of Harris and Klebold. Peyerl commented one day leading up to 1 November 1999, that it was "completely crazy what these guys have done" and that he believed Harris' and Klebold's actions to be "something we should do".

== Aftermath ==
Numerous politicians, including Minister of the Interior Otto Schily, called for changes in German firearm legislation following Peyerl's indiscriminate shooting on 1 November 1999. Schools implemented crisis plans in the event of an active shooter scenario and a closer monitoring of students with suspected depression or suicidal ideation. State police agencies changed their response strategy, favouring a direct approach and elimination of an immediate threat, rather than the previous method of evacuation and waiting for trained SEK forces. Rudolf and Theresa Peyerl were interviewed as witnesses by police shortly after, and the German Kriminalpolizei started an investigation. Wolfgang Giese, head of the investigation, denied the possibility that drugs, alcohol, or extreme right-wing ideology were behind Peyerl's actions, saying those things played "no role". Instead, Giese asserted, the problem was "in the personality of the offender". Criminologist Rudolf Egg posited that Peyerl's interest in neo-Nazi subculture was less political in nature and more related to his own insecurities, speculating that he may have felt "empowered" and "superior" by associating himself with a larger movement.

Investigators concluded that Martin Peyerl, like Eric Harris and Dylan Klebold, did not commit murder-suicide as a spontaneous act, but likely planned his actions well in advance. Peyerl left behind no journal or videos as the Columbine killers did, however, leaving his actions for the most part a mystery. Despite this, investigators remained certain that Peyerl's own death was as much a part of whatever plan he devised as the indiscriminate shooting of others. A written request filed by The Greens to the Bavarian Landtag in January 2012 listed the Bad Reichenhall shooting as one of several murder cases to be reinvestigated for a potential right-wing motive.

Günter Lamprecht, through his lawyer Rolf Bossi, filed a lawsuit for pain and suffering against Peyerl's parents, but the case was ultimately not brought to court.

== See also ==
- Columbine effect
