= Mannheim I (electoral district) =

State electoral district of Germany

35: Mannheim I
- Electoral district for the Landtag of Baden-Württemberg
- Mannheim I in 2026
- District: Mannheim
- Electorate: 94,429 (2026)
- Major settlements: Käfertal, Wohlgelegen, Neckarstad-West, Sandhofen, Schönau, Vogelstang, Waldhof, and Wallstadt

Current electoral district
- Party: AfD
- Member: Bernhard Pepperl

Mannheim I is an electoral constituency (German: Wahlkreis) represented in the Landtag of Baden-Württemberg.

Since 2026, it has elected one member via first-past-the-post voting. Voters cast a second vote under which additional seats are allocated proportionally state-wide. Under the constituency numbering system, it is designated as constituency 35.

It is wholly within the city of Mannheim.

== Geography ==
The constituency includes the districts of Käfertal, Wohlgelegen, Neckarstad-West, Sandhofen, Schönau, Vogelstang, Waldhof, and Wallstadt within the city of Mannheim.

There were 94,429 eligible voters in 2026.

== Members ==
=== First mandate ===
Both prior to and since the electoral reforms for the 2026 election, the winner of the plurality of the vote (first-past-the-post) in every constituency won the first mandate.

Election	Member	Party	%
1992	Max Nagel	CDU	
1996	Max Nagel	CDU	
2001	Max Nagel	CDU	47.7
Mar 2004	Roland Weiß	CDU	47.7
2006	Frank Mentrup	CDU	40.0
2011	Stefan Fulst-Blei	CDU	34.2
2016	Rüdiger Klos	AfD	23.0
2021	Susanne Aschhoff	Grüne	27.8
2026	Bernhard Pepperl	AfD	22.3

=== Second mandate ===
Prior to the electoral reforms for the 2026 election, the seats in the state parliament were allocated proportionately amongst parties which received more than 5% of valid votes across the state. The seats that were won proportionally for parties that did not win as many first mandates as seats they were entitled to, were allocated to their candidates which received the highest proportion of the vote in their respective constituencies. This meant that following some elections, a constituency would have one or more members elected under a second mandate.

Prior to 2011, these second mandates were allocated to the party candidates who got the greatest number of votes, whilst from 2011-2021, these were allocated according to percentage share of the vote.

Prior to 2016, this constituency did not elect any members on a second mandate.

Election	Member	Party
2016	Stefan Fulst-Blei	SPD
2021	Stefan Fulst-Blei	SPD

== Election results ==
=== 2026 election ===
State election (2026): Mannheim I
Notes:	Blue background denotes the winner of the electorate vote. Pink background denotes a candidate elected from their party list. Yellow background denotes an electorate win by a list member, or other incumbent. A ✓ or ✗ denotes status of any incumbent, win or lose respectively.						
Party	Candidate	Votes	%	±%	Party votes	%	±%
AfD	Bernhard Pepperl	11,371	22.3	▲9.6	11,080	21.7	▲9.1
CDU	Lennart Christ	11,046	21.7	▲6.5	10,165	20.0	▲4.7
Greens	Chris Rihm	10,991	21.6	▼6.2	14,063	27.6	▼0.2
SPD	Stefan Fulst-Blei	8,897	17.5	▼4.2	5,630	11.1	▼10.6
Left	Philipp Fränkle	4,648	9.1	▲2.9	4,569	9.0	▲2.7
FDP	Oskar Weiß	1,156	2.3	▼4.4	1,347	2.6	▼4.0
FW	Jan Tiggeler	1,033	2.0	▼0.9	748	1.5	▼1.5
BSW	Wolfgang Höhfeld	947	1.9		1,035	2.0	
APT					755	1.5	
Volt	Erasmios Ntamkas	667	1.3	▲0.5	573	1.1	▲0.4
PARTEI					331	0.6	▼1.6
Independent	Cem Caglayan	132	0.3				
Pensioners					124	0.2	
dieBasis					109	0.2	▼0.7
Team Todenhöfer					96	0.2	
Values					67	0.1	
Bündnis C					54	0.1	
Verjüngungsforschung					49	0.1	
KlimalisteBW					43	0.1	▼1.1
ÖDP					40	0.1	▼0.5
PdF					39	0.1	
Humanists					27	0.1	
Informal votes		428			372		
Total valid votes		50,888			50,944		
Turnout		51,316	54.3	▲3.0			
AfD gain from Greens	Majority	325	0.6				

=== 2021 election ===
State election (2021): Mannheim I
Party	Candidate	Votes	%	±%
Greens	Susanne Aschhoff	12,925	27.8	▲5.9
SPD	Stefan Fulst-Blei	10,064	21.7	▼0.5
CDU	Lennart Christ	7,079	15.2	▼2.0
AfD	Robert Schmidt	5,895	12.7	▼10.3
FDP	Julia Schilling	3,089	6.7	▲0.7
Left	Sven Metzmeier	2,889	6.2	▲1.1
FW	Martina Irmscher	1,377	3.0	
PARTEI	Anna Timme	1,049	2.3	▲0.9
KlimalisteBW	Jessica Martin	570	1.2	
dieBasis	Andreas Baum	427	0.9	
Volt	Michael Vogtmann	355	0.8	
ÖDP	Martin Weinmann	248	0.5	▼0.2
Independent	Klaus Hellmer	228	0.5	
WiR2020	Uwe Kempermann	226	0.5	
Majority		2,861	6.1	
Rejected ballots		468	1.0	▼0.2
Turnout		46,889	51.3	▼7.5
Registered electors		91,398		
Greens gain from AfD		Swing		

== See also ==
- Politics of Baden-Württemberg
- Landtag of Baden-Württemberg
