= List of killings by law enforcement officers in post-reunification Germany (2020s) =

Listed below are people killed by non-military law enforcement officers in Germany after reunification on 3 October 1990, whether or not in the line of duty, irrespective of reason or method. Included, too, are cases where individuals died in police custody due to applied techniques. Inclusion in the list implies neither wrongdoing nor justification on the part of the person killed or the officer involved. The listing simply documents occurrences of deaths and is not complete.

== Statistics ==
Year	Number killed by use of firearms (official statistics)	Number killed by any means (counted)	Number of shots fired on persons
2020	15	20	75
2021	8	15	51
2022	11 (e.g. Mouhamed Dramé)	18	60
2023	10	14	66
2024	22		75
2025	17		115
2026	9		
Total	92	67	442

== 2020 ==
Date (YYYY-MM-DD)	Name	Age	Place	State	Summary of events
2020-01-06	Bulğu, Mehmet	37	Gelsenkirchen	Nordrhein-Westfalen	A Turkish national was damaging a patrol car with a baton outside of a police station. Two officers, aged 23 and 41, confronted the man, who then attacked them. The younger police recruit issued repeated verbal warnings, ordering the attacker to drop both the baton and a knife he was holding in the other hand. The officer fired four shots the man, hitting the man at least once and killing him. Although the man had yelled "Allahu Akbar" and was stated to have previously claimed allegiance to the Islamic State, an investigation concluded that he was mentally ill (the man had said he used to live in the territory of the Islamic State and that "Nazi Germany broke [his] brain") and had no verifiable ties to any terrorist organisation. He had a lengthy criminal record for slander and property damage, most recently an incident in which he tried to log a piece of forest to "build a shrine to Allah" without a permit.
2020-01-24	B., Maria	33	Berlin	Berlin	A man called police because his roommate, who had suspected mental and drug problems, was threatening him with a knife at their apartment in Friedrichshain. She refused to leave her room when four officers arrived and attacked them when they opened the door. After issuing several warnings, a 28-year-old officer then fatally shot her once in the torso. The woman's death was heavily protested due to unfounded claims that she was killed due to her links with the local antifa movement. Neighbors also pointed out that the deceased, who suffered from multiple sclerosis and weighed in at less than 50 kg, should have been easily overpowered by four armed officers.
2020-02-03	N.N.	66	Vellmar	Hessen	Two police officers stopped and arrested a drunk driver suspected of crashing his vehicle. During the drive, as they were about to reach the police station for the suspect to undergo a blood test, the man pulled out a knife and threatened to stab the officer next to him. Both officers exited the car and locked the man inside, but after cutting himself with the weapon and breaking the car window, he stepped out and rushed at the officers, who opened fire. He was shot multiple times as the initial shot did not slow his advance, causing his death at the scene shortly after. The three officers involved were investigated, but not charged in March 2021.
2020-02-14	N.N.	30	Berlin	Berlin	A police car was responding to a call about an ongoing armed robbery when the officers struck and killed a pedestrian in Marzahn. The man had been obscured behind a parked bus at the stop. No investigation occurred after the officer driving passed an alcohol test and was found to have upheld the speed limits. However, the officer was ultimately sentenced to a 7800 euro fine in a civil lawsuit in 2025 as he had turned off the police siren seconds before the collision, making the death negligent on the officer's part.
2020-04-03	F., Annabelle	10	Vogtareuth	Bayern	36-year old federal police officer Ramona F. killed both of her daughters with her service pistol, before killing herself. It was initially reported by media that the lingering effects of abuse during the officer's childhood and workplace bullying were considered factors in the killings, but the latter was refuted by investigators, who believed that the married officer was motivated by her lover breaking up with her.
2020-04-03	F., Vivien	12	Vogtareuth	Bayern	36-year old federal police officer Ramona F. killed both of her daughters with her service pistol, before killing herself. It was initially reported by media that the lingering effects of abuse during the officer's childhood and workplace bullying were considered factors in the killings, but the latter was refuted by investigators, who believed that the married officer was motivated by her lover breaking up with her.
2020-04-16	N.N.	32	Düsseldorf	Nordrhein-Westfalen	Following a family dispute in Lierenfeld, a man threatened his parents with a crossbow and a gun, firing several gunshots from a window. When SEK arrived, the man was seen handling a makeshift explosive before he shot a police dog with a bolt and shot at the officers with his firearm. He was fatally wounded when police returned fire and died at the scene.
2020-04-25	N.N.	40	Dormagen	Nordrhein-Westfalen	Police were called to a house after reports came in of a possible violent crime having taken place. At the scene, officers were met with a "suspicious individual", who was fatally shot once under unclear circumstances and died despite immediate resuscitation attempts. A search of the house revealed that the deceased had murdered his 74-year-old father.
2020-04-28	N.N.	26	Harsum	Niedersachsen	A couple in Hüddessum called police because their son was trying to kick down their front door. The son attacked the two responding officer with a pitchfork, heavily injuring them, before he was shot twice in the legs by a 58-year-old officer, later dying at a hospital.
2020-05-08	N.N.	67	Osnabrück	Niedersachsen	A man was supposed to be involuntarily committed to a mental institution when he attacked the workers sent to fetch him. Three police officers were sent to assist and were attacked by the man with a knife. He was then shot twice and was found dead after he retreated back to his flat.
2020-05-26	Bündgens, Peter	37	Aachen	Nordrhein-Westfalen	On 25 May, two mental patients with convictions for robbery escaped a psychiatric hospital in Bedburg-Hau after threatening two nurses with a knife. They engaged police in a car chase before one of them took a woman hostage at a school playground. After ignoring several warnings, the hostage-taker was fatally shot by two officers, who each fired one shot. The other man, 47-year-old Stefan Kümmel, who had been threatening a young mother from a distance, then surrendered and was arrested without incident.
2020-06-18	Idrissi, Mohamed	54	Bremen	Bremen	Police were called to assist a landlady and housing staff in Gröpelingen during the inspection of an apartment, as the resident, who was due to be evicted for causing water damage, had known mental issues; he had been diagnosed with paranoid schizophrenia and was known to compulsively flood his apartment for "cleaning". Although the man was cooperative during the inspection, officers wanted to bring him to the police station to evaluate his state of mind as they found the landlady's request unusual, suspecting he might be a danger to others since the water damage could have caused electrical accidents. The man refused and pulled out a knife after being confronted in the courtyard by the two officers, who had called two plainclothed officers as backup. Cell phone video by a neighbour showed that the officers talked to the man for several minutes, attempting to convince him to lay down the knife. He was eventually startled by an officer's movement, adopting a "boxer pose", causing a 23-year-old officer to use pepper spray on the man, who proceeded to charge at the officer. After taking several steps backwards, the officer shot his attacker twice, leading to his death at a hospital. As the deceased was originally from Morocco, a racial debate ensued in regards to the police's seemingly unorganised actions, including that the officers had failed to wait for medical professionals with a background in psychology to show up before informing the man about an evaluation.
2020-06-18	Diallo, Mamadou Alpha	23	Twist	Niedersachsen	A Guinean asylum seeker threatened several persons inside a doctor's office and the nearby apartment building he lived in with a knife. He was shot in the leg by a police officer. He died in a hospital the next morning.
2020-07-07	N.N.	57	Mainz	Rheinland-Pfalz	A Russian man attacked a 76-year-old neighbour with a knife in a senior citizen community, injuring him in the face and arm. He barricaded himself in his apartment afterwards and as police were waiting for SEK to arrive, the man opened the door and walked towards the officers with his knife drawn. After pepper spray and a taser shot didn't stop him, police fired four gunshots, with three fatally hitting the man, who died at the scene.
2020-07-15	N.N.	29	Bad Schussenried	Baden-Württemberg	Two mental patients escaped from a psychiatric facility where they had both been involuntarily committed for numerous years. When they were caught by three police officers, the pair, both armed with knives, threatened the officers, with the male patient chasing after one of them while the 43-year old female patient kept the other two at bay. The officer eventually shot his pursuer in the hip, while the other two shot the woman in the thigh. The woman survived with critical injuries while the man died at a hospital.
2020-10-05	N.N.	54	Leichlingen	Nordrhein-Westfalen	Police officers were called to help in a case of a family dispute. A man was in a fight with his sister. To stop the martial artists heavy resistance, he was fixated on the ground where he suffered a cardiac arrest.
2020-10-16	N.N.	40	Münster	Nordrhein-Westfalen	An inmate convicted of resisting arrest took a 29-year-old female guard-in-training hostage with a double-sharpened toothbrush shiv and demanded a getaway helicopter, despite being due to be released on 10 November. After three hours, the inmate was shot four times by SEK to save the guard's life, partially owing to him being noted "unpredictable"; the hostage later stated that the inmate, a known alcoholic, claimed to be "the son of the Virgin Mary" and "Thor from the movies", and insisted he needed to be released to "get to a red house in Spain to get [his] hammer to defeat the coronavirus". He had a prior record for the attempted murder of his own mother.
2020-10-30	N.N.	30	Dornstetten	Baden-Württemberg	A police car responding to a call struck and killed a pedestrian while driving on B28. The woman was jaywalking and had suddenly stepped onto the highway, with investigators unable to confirm whether it was an accident or suicide.
2020-11-10	I., Rosario	46	Tegernsee	Bayern	An Italian man had taken his long-time girlfriend, a 25-year-old Romanian national, and their infant son hostage. He refused to listen to police and demanded to speak to his adult son. After the son was unable to convince his father to surrender, officers stormed the premises and fatally shot the man after he stabbed his girlfriend. Both died of their injuries at the scene.
2020-11-12	N.N.	58	Erligheim	Baden-Württemberg	A bank employee reported a pair of suspicious men lurking outside her workplace. One of the robbers was shot after he attacked police with a 35 cm long screwdriver. He and a 29-year-old accomplice had attempted to break open an ATM with explosives. The deceased robber, a Lithuanian national, was found to have been wanted throughout Europe for similar crimes and was most recently linked to a bank heist on 20 October, when he and his new partner blew up several ATMs in Besigheim and stole 135,000 euro.

== 2021 ==
Date (YYYY-MM-DD)	Name	Age	Place	State	Summary of events
2021-01-06	N.N.	65	Mülheim	Nordrhein-Westfalen	Police was called to a house because of loud noise. There a man shot at SEK with a revolver, after which a policewoman shot him in the heart and head. It was later revealed that the man had been arguing with a 55-year old ex-girlfriend and neighbor, and fired three gunshots at her front door. The gun was unlicenced and the deceased had a previous record for possessing explosives. A search of his apartment found Nazi memorabilia. The shooting was deemed self-defense.
2021-03-06	Khalaf, Qosay Sadam	19	Delmenhorst	Niedersachsen	An Iraqi Yazidi man was beaten and peppersprayed after he attempted to escape police when he was caught smoking marijuana in a public park with a friend. He had been denied medical attention by both the police officers and attending paramedics. The man died at a hospital in Oldenburg the next day, with his cause of death being listed as circulatory failure due to oxygen deprivation compounded by "blunt trauma to the head, torso, and extremities". An investigation into the death was ceased in June 2021.
2021-04-13	Manczak, Karsten	51	Liebenburg	Niedersachsen	50-year-old federal police officer Martin G. killed his friend after coaxing his way into the victim's house. The officer had become obsessed with the victim's wife and killed him in hopes of entering a relationship with her. G. was convicted of murder in April 2023, but the murder method and body's location remain unknown, though investigators generally suspect usage of a crossbow and that the body was hidden using concrete blocks.
2021-04-24	N.N.	59	Köln	Nordrhein-Westfalen	Three police officers were sent to arrest a woman wanted for a hit-and-run at her brother's apartment in Bickendorf. The drunk father of the siblings disrupted the process and insulted the officers. Two more officers were called in, after which the father was wrestled to the ground, where he was beaten and kicked repeatedly, suffering two broken ribs, which were not given medical attention by police. Two months later, the man died of sepsis related to pneumonia caused by insufficient treatment of the rib injuries. The officers initially denied that any physical harm had occurred, supported by some eyewitnesse testimonies, but were implicated by a text message made by the 40-year old team leader, who wrote that he "slapped someone down just now" the day of the incident. The five officers involved were tried with dangerous assault starting November 2023.
2021-05-28	K., Omar	36	Hamburg	Hamburg	A Lebanese-born Palestinian refugee was threatening passerby in Winterhude with a knife while shouting "Allahu Akbar". Arriving police unsuccessfully attempted to incapacitate him with pepper spray and taser usage before an officer shot and killed the man with seven shots when he ignored further commands to put down the knife. The deceased had previously been convicted in 2019 for attempted rape in Ellerbek, which was highly publicised because the victim, a 23-year-old Russian au-pair, had bit off part of his finger, which contributed to his arrest.
2021-06-13	N.N.	35	Wuppertal	Nordrhein-Westfalen	A woman called police after her neighbour rang her doorbell at midnight and accused her of stealing from his room. Officers were unable to receive a response despite repeated knocking and verbal commands and as they discussed whether they should force open the locked door to the neighbour's apartment, the tenant opened the door and threw a knife. He was shot three times when he approached the officers while holding a club and a bladed object.
2021-06-22	Atasoy, Soner	41	Frankfurt am Main	Hessen	A woman in Griesheim called police to report multiple loud voices coming from a neighbouring flat. The call was treated as a potential hazardous situation, despite the shift leader emphasizing that the tenant was "harmless", and three police officers and a police recruit were dispatched to respond. After knocking on the door, the tenant opened the door, wearing a bullet-proof vest with a knife attachment and after an "aggressive exchange", the man shoved an officer down the stairs, pulled out a pistol and pointed it at the officers, who then shot him multiple times. As he was able to lock the door on the officers, SEK was called to force open the apartment, where they found the man dead from a gunshot wound; he had died approximately two-and-a-half hours after being shot. The gun was identified as a gas pistol. The man already had a criminal record for multiple counts of assault, as well as a history of recurrent psychosis, specifically repeated self-talking and nightmare-induced screaming. Two officers were tried in court after the deceased's family claimed that the official report conflicted with the man's character, but neither were charged.
2021-06-24	N.N.	45	Freudenstadt	Baden-Württemberg	Police were called when a woman reported that her husband had beaten her. As they were trying to defuse the argument between the couple, the husband pulled out a knife and attacked the officers, being shot twice by one in response and dying at the scene.
2021-08-25	I., Abdulkadir	39	Groß-Gerau	Hessen	A Somali man injured his wife, mother-in-law and two neighbours with an onion knife following an argument. The man had reportedly been suffering from chronic insomnia, but was refusing to go to a doctor despite his family's insistence. Police confronted him in a parking lot and ordered him to put down the knife. Officers fired 14 shots, five of which struck the man in the torso and legs and died as paramedics tended to him; the fatal round had ricocheted off his arm and hit vital organs in the chest.
2021-10-03	N.N.	39	Garbsen	Niedersachsen	A man called police and made "incoherent statements", leading to officers being dispatched to check on a possible psychiatric situation. SEK was called when the man threatened the officers with a knife and incapacitated him with a taser shot. He died 15 hours later at a hospital from multiple organ failure, a compounding factor being that the recovering alcoholic was suffering from withdrawal for two days.
2021-10-03	Ibrahim, Kamal	40	Stade	Niedersachsen	A Sudanese man with psychiatric issues was threatening people while intoxicated, leading to the police being called three separate times. The first two incidents were resolved through talking, with the man voluntarily entering custody and spending five hours in a drunk tank. When police responded a third time at the man's residence at a refugee accommodation, he was found threatening other residents with a knife before charging at the officers and was shot 13 times.
2021-10-06	N.N.	53	Neustadt an der Weinstraße	Rheinland-Pfalz	Residents called police because a man was screaming on the street below and blocking people from entering the building. He attacked arriving police, injuring a 26-year-old policewoman with a kick in the head, before he was pepper sprayed and tasered. He lost consciousness and died at a hospital from cardiac arrest.
2021-10-15	N.N.	83	Neuss	Nordrhein-Westfalen	Police were called because an elderly pedestrian was walking on the Neuss-West Interchange on A46. A squad car was dispatched to secure the man and as the officers rounded into the interchange, they accidentally struck the pedestrian, who died of his injuries at the scene. The officer driving was unharmed while his colleague suffered light cuts from broken glass during the collision.
2021-11-01	Zantiotis, Giórgios	24	Wuppertal	Nordrhein-Westfalen	Police were called by a taxi driver because he believed an argument between his two passengers was escalating. Officers arrived at the scene to find a man "behaving aggressively" towards his sister and arrested him by putting him in a prone position while one officer held him down with a knee on his back. During an attempted blood test at the station two hours later, the man collapsed and could not be resuscitated. His cause of death was attributed to heart failure due to weight-related cardiomegaly and amphetamine usage, as shown by both the official autopsy and a second one ordered by the deceased's family.
2021-12-04	Limp, Laurent	19	Köln	Nordrhein-Westfalen	On 3 December, police arrested a teenager and his friend after the latter kicked a parked truck, after which the truck driver claimed the other was carrying a knife. Although no knife was found, both were arrested and put into temporary holding cells. The teenager from Bonn showed signs of intoxication and while questioning revealed he was under the influence of alcohol, tilidine and diazepam, no medical attendant was alerted and he was instead sent to a drunk tank. When the teenager was due to be released the next morning, officers, who thought the occupant had been sleeping, noticed he wasn't breathing. First aid, reanimation and hospitalisation followed, but the teenager died in intensive care on 6 December from hypoxia-related brain damage with cerebral edema as well as kidney failure. The deceased's family sought an investigation for neglected duty to rescue.
2021-12-26	N.N.	35	Herford	Nordrhein-Westfalen	A man injured his girlfriend with a knife. After she called police, the man threatened officers with a gas pistol. He was shot and died at a hospital in Bielefeld on 28 December.

== 2022 ==
Date (YYYY-MM-DD)	Name	Age	Place	State	Summary of events
2022-01-01	N.N.	40	Jena	Thüringen	A woman called police because her adult son was acting aggressively. The man attacked and wounded five officers, one heavily by biting a piece of the officer's ear off, before he was subdued and fixated. He suffered head injuries during the arrest and died at a hospital on 4 January.
2022-02-16	N.N.	58	Kirchheim unter Teck	Baden-Württemberg	A 59-year-old LKA police officer killed his wife with his service weapon before killing himself. The officer had waited for his wife in the parking lot of her workplace at a supermarket and after killing her, he entered his car and shot himself in the head. The wife had previously reported the officer for threatening her to his colleagues. An investigation into whether the police department may have been aware of the officer's intent to murder was halted in January 2023.
2022-02-25	M., Petar	47	Gunzenhausen	Bayern	A man set his house on fire after previously causing a disturbance by throwing things on the boardwalk. While the fire department were extinguishing the flames, the man attacked police first responders with a knife, who, after pepper spray proved ineffective, shot him two times, causing his death at a hospital the same night.
2022-03-10	Scherschin, Daniel	31	Hagelstadt	Bayern	A woman called police because a man had assaulted her husband, after the latter asked the stranger to stop setting dry leaves on fire. Officers apprehended the man, a diagnosed schizophrenic, and fixated him on the ground after binding his hands and feet. He lost consciousness shortly after and died from cardiac arrest. The officers' bodycams were switched off at the time and the autopsy contrary to the police report that the deceased's body bore several bruises.
2022-04-12	N.N.	50	Neukirchen-Vluyn	Nordrhein-Westfalen	A police patrol was sent to a flat where a tenant was reportedly throwing objects out of the window while shouting incoherently. The man then threatened the officers with a butcher's knife. SEK was called in, who shot the man when he attacked them as well.
2022-04-20	K., Marcel	39	Berlin	Berlin	Police found three homeless men loitering inside a building's staircase in Niederschöneweide at night. Two of the men left upon being asked, while the third argued with the officers and attacked them by tossing a beer bottle and throwing punches at them. The officers used pepper spray on the man and had fixated him on the ground when he experienced shortness of breath before collapsing. He was reanimated but died at a hospital on 27 April.
2022-05-02	Paponja, Ante	47	Mannheim	Baden-Württemberg	Police were called by a psychologist of the ZI, who was concerned for the wellbeing of an outpatient diagnosed with schizophrenia and anxiety disorder and asked for assistance in finding him. Two officers accompanied the doctor in looking for the man, eventually finding him walking near Mannheimer Marktplatz in Schönau. The officers then attempted to perform a search of his person, to which the man resisted, leading to a struggle. Video footage filmed by bystanders showed the incident, in which the officers were seen holding the man down on the ground, with a 27-year old officer striking the man in the head four times. The man lost consciousness after collapsing during the arrest and although he was resuscitated by the doctor at the scene and brought to the University Hospital Mannheim, he died the same day from hypoxia, never regaining consciousness. The death led to allegations of police brutality and discrimination, as the victim, born in Heidelberg, was of Croatian descent and citizenship. The officer was tried and on 3 March 2024, he was sentenced to 6000 euro fine.
2022-05-10	N.N.	31	Mannheim	Baden-Württemberg	A man threatened to kill himself during an argument with his mother at their home in Waldhof, who called police while her son repeatedly cut himself with a knife. Police attempted to incapacitate the man with tear gas, but when this did not work, they decided to shoot him in the leg. The man was brought to a hospital where he died of the gunshot wound.
2022-07-02	N.N.	37	Weißenfels	Sachsen-Anhalt	Two police officers caught a burglar in the act and because he resisted arrest, "forceful measures" were used to subdue the suspect. The man lost consciousness as a result of and died two days later.
2022-08-02	Farah, Amin	23	Frankfurt	Hessen	A hotel in the red-light district of Bahnhofsviertel informed police, that a man was armed with a knife and threatening other guests. It was later found that the man had met with two prostitutes he hired in one of the hotel rooms and tried to force them to use drugs. When they declined, he pulled out a knife and after they fled, the man continued to act erratically. By the SEK arrived in the hotel, the man had returned to his room, sitting in the doorframe of the bathroom. Officers sent in a police dog, which bit into the man's arm, causing him to stab and heavily injure the animal. SEK then fired six shots, with five hitting the man in the arm, shoulder, chest, and head. It was initially reported that the man succumbed to his wounds the same day, but later revised their statements, confirming he died instantly from the headshot. He was identified as a homeless person originally from Somalia and recent resident of Jijiga, Ethiopia, with an intensive criminal record of violence and drugs. According to family, he had immigrated to Darmstadt at 16 for work, but quit his career and began using drugs after his wife abroad was murdered in 2019. The officer who fired the killing shots was investigated, but no charges were brought up after the shooting was deemed self-defense. The deceased's brother has filed a complaint from Jijiga, saying police never communicated surrender or had their lives endangered.
2022-08-03	Berditchevski, Jozef "Jouzef"	48	Köln	Nordrhein-Westfalen	A Jewish Russian busker known for performing outside the Kölner Philharmonie attempted to attack a bailiff and her police escort with a knife while they were serving a court-ordered eviction in his apartment in Ostheim. Officers used pepper spray on the man and then shot him twice. He had been drunk and was noted to have a psychiatric record, most recently having made a suicide threat in June when the eviction was announced. The investigation into the killing was stopped six months later.
2022-08-07	Dramé, Mouhamed Lamine	25	Dortmund	Nordrhein-Westfalen	A social worker at a youth home for unaccompanied minors in Nordstadt called police about a Senegalese refugee, who had voiced suicidal intentions while pointing a knife at his stomach. Twelve police officers were dispatched and during the confrontation, the man was shot five times in the stomach, jaw and arm, dying during treatment in an ambulance. The shooting was prominently reported on due to allegations of poor police training to mental health crises, possible racial discrimination, and a lack of transparency from the NRW government, law enforcement, and later the deceased's family. Although audio from the incident was recorded because the phone call wasn't ended properly, the exact circumstances were initially unclear and it was claimed by the NRW's ministry of home affairs that the deceased had attacked the officers. In November, however, the officers admitted to lying about the chain of events. The deceased had never pointed the weapon away from himself, having remained in a squatting position with his head in his knees, and only became roused when he was pepper sprayed without warning, at which point the man ran at the officers, who were in the way of the only exit route, causing three of them to simultaneously opened fire, two with tasers and another with a submachine gun. The body cameras were also all shut off, but this was later shown to be in line with protocol mandating that possible cases of suicide attempts are not to be filmed. Five of the officers were tried beginning 19 December 2023, the one who fired the killing shots for negligent homicide, the team leader for incitement and three others for dangerous assault. They were all found not guilty on 12 December 2024. On part of the victim, it came to light that much of his background was unverified and partially fabricated. Though he was registered as a 16-year-old Malian national, he had lied about his actual age, with Spiegel TV reporting that he was really 25 years old, his family and Facebook profile giving the birthyear 1997. There are also conflicting reports about his inability to understand German, after it published that he was investigated for sexual harassment, after a woman who was solicited for sex and chased by an unidentified black male on 3 July 2022, gave a description led to the temporary arrest of Dramé by police. The suspect had asked if she spoke French, Spanish or English, with the latter two languages having been used to communicate with Dramé, but it could not be found if he was truly the perpetrator in the case.
2022-08-07	H., Sascha	39	Oer-Erkenschwick	Nordrhein-Westfalen	A man under the influence of drugs was rampaging in an apartment following what was suspected to have been a domestic argument with a woman. He heavily resisted as police were attempting to arrest the man in front of the building and after pepper spray didn't affect him, he was fixated on the ground in a prone position. The man lost consciousness and died the same night at a hospital. Around 150 people witnessed the arrest, some attesting that the man made complaints about being unable to breathe, and it is alleged that those who had filmed the incident had their phone confiscated and the videos deleted by the officers. Police put the officers under investigation for assault and tampering with evidence and have contracted an IT firm to restore the footage for analysis.
2022-09-04	N.N.	23	Berlin	Berlin	Police shot and killed a Kosovar man with two shots at an apartment in Lichtenberg after he allegedly killed a 27 year old Ukrainian woman with an axe following an argument.
2022-09-07	W., René	36	Leipzig	Sachsen	After he was caught shoplifting beer and potatoes at a supermarket, a man returned to the store to threaten the employees with a knife. Police came to arrest the man at his home and was shot twice when he tried to stab the officers. He died of his injuries at a hospital.
2022-09-08	N.N.	30	Ansbach	Bayern	An Afghan refugee attacked a 17-year-old at the main train station, strangling and stabbing him as well as a 20-year-old man who managed to disarm him. The man then charged at arriving police officers who shot and killed him. Although Islam extremism was considered a motive due to the attacker yelling "Allahu Akbar", police did not label the stabbing a terrorist incident, but rather attributed it to the fact that he was about to face deportation due to convictions for a sex crime and possession of drugs, also noting that he had apparently been abusing anti-depressants.
2022-09-14	Mutombo, Kupa Ilunga Medard	64	Berlin	Berlin	A Congolese man with schizophrenia was supposed to be transported from a care center in Spandau to a psychiatric hospital. After medical attendants had failed to convince the man to come with them, three police officers attempted to forcefully remove him from his room. The man's caretaker said that the officers had repeatedly punched his patient in the head while they kept him fixated on the ground, with one officer kneeing on his neck, which police justified because the elderly man had attempted to hit, kick and bite them. The man fell into a coma and died three weeks later on 6 October from "hypoxia-related brain damage".
2022-10-19	N.N.	44	Dortmund	Nordrhein-Westfalen	A homeless man was damaging cars while yelling for help in a street in Dorstfeld. He attacked arriving police, punching one officer and attempting to drive away in a squad car before he was shot with a taser, immediately collapsing. Officers performed CPR until an ambulance arrived to take him to a hospital, where he died as a result of a heart attack. An autopsy showed that the man was a heavy alcoholic and had severe tachyarrhythmia.
2022-10-24	R., Timo	31	Zülpich	Nordrhein-Westfalen	A man attempted to break down the door to his parents' house after finding they had changed out the locks in response to his entering and theft, also damaging his own car outside. When two police officers arrived, he attacked a 25-year-old policewoman with a knife and held it to her throat before he was fatally shot once in the head by her 35-year-old colleague.
2022-12-10	W., David	40	Dresden	Sachsen	A man from Heidenau shot and killed his 62-year-old mother in Prohlis after she called police saying her son was threatening to harm her and others. He then fetched the nine-year-old child of an acquaintance and unsuccessfully tried gain entry to a local radio station, shooting the door 10 times, after which he entered the Altstadt-Galerie mall where he took a 38-year old drug store manager at gunpoint and hid away with his two hostages in her office. The situation was resolved within an hour when a SEK sniper shot him, leading to his death at a hospital the same morning. The deceased had been recorded for mental illness, having been most recently institutionalised on 14 October and released after a few weeks for claiming that he was being stalked by "satanist disciples". A man who was briefly taken hostage at the studio similarly overheard the kidnapper saying he needed to get on live air to "warn people about the satanists".

== 2023 ==
Date (YYYY-MM-DD)	Name	Age	Place	State	Summary of events
2023-01-03	Bah, Mamadou "Johnson"	38	Braunschweig	Niedersachsen	On 1 January, police were called to a bar where an assault with pepper spray occurred during an argument between four men. Three of those involved along with wintesses identified a Guinean patron as the offender. During questioning, the man became aggressive and insulted and spat at officers due to which he was restrained and brought to the police station. There he tried to punch two officers, who evaded the attack and pinned him to a wall before letting him fall to the ground. He was semi-conscious when he was put in a holding cell, where a doctor found the man unresponsive when she came for a blood sample. He was brought to a hospital where he died two days later from cardiac arrest. Alcohol and cocaine was found in his blood. Surveillance and phone footage later proved that the arrested man was actually the victim of the initial assault.
2023-01-13	B., Robert	46	Mosbach	Baden-Württemberg	A man from Karlsruhe with a record for domestic violence was reported for standing in front of the residence of his ex-partner in Neckarelz and screaming while holding a knife. He threatened responding police, who used tear gas to no effect before a 22-year-old officer shot him. The deceased had been embroiled in a custody dispute at the time of his death and was released from voluntary mental health treatment earlier in the month.
2023-03-07	Meinicke, Marcus	34	Senftenberg	Brandenburg	A woman called police about loud noise coming from her neighbour's flat. Two police officers forced the door open after receiving no response to knocking, finding the tenant damaging furniture and walls with an axe. He then charged at the officers and was fatally shot. Although police initially reported that two shots were fired, at least eleven bullet holes were counted at the scene. The deceased's family twice filed a complaint to the state to order an investigation and trial for manslaughter, but they were dismissed in January and April 2024.
2023-03-17	N.N.	32	Jarmen	Mecklenburg-Vorpommern	Three police officers were sent to serve an arrest warrant for a man with known mental issues. On their arrival at his residence, the man was at first cooperative before he attacked with a 60 cm shortsword, heavily injuring the arm of a 47-year old officer, who fired once and killed the suspect.
2023-04-11	Novacov, Vitali	45	Königs Wusterhausen	Brandenburg	A Moldovan-born Bulgarian man was rampaging in front of his apartment building in Niederlehme during a mental health emergency. Police incapacitated him with pepper spray and fixated him, after which he lost consciousness and died at a hospital in Berlin despite being reanimated. His cause of death was brain damage caused by continued oxygen deprivation. Mud was found in the deceased's mouth and lungs, with it being reported that the officers pressed his face into the ground for a prolonged amount of time and also misrepresented first aid, having falsely claimed to have removed the handcuffs when the man collapsed. One of the two civilian residents of the apartment building who had aided the officers in restraining the deceased had also reportedly punched him in the face until he bled, but was never charged. Local activists blamed anti-Romani sentiment for the killing, although it was never definitively proven that the deceased was a Rom, and protested the death.
2023-06-06	N.N.	35	Ingolstadt	Bayern	A police patrol encountered a naked man near a railway, who ran away after spotting the officers. He eventually stopped at a bridge and threatened to kill himself by jumping, leading to a five-hour stand-off during which SEK was called in to help negotiate and an attempt at arrest failed despite the use of pepper spray. The man then fled again into some nearby woods and during the search, the man, holding a large branch, reportedly charged at a SEK officer after hiding in a bush. He was subsequently shot once in the chest and died at a hospital. It was later found that the deceased was a Czech national with a lengthy criminal record for burglary and drug-related crime.
2023-07-11	Oswald, Danny	39	Berlin	Berlin	An intoxicated man was reported in Friedrichshain for rampaging in a store, snatching a bag from a witness and throwing it in the Spree and breaking into a construction container. Two officers fixated him to the ground and handcuffed him, but when he complained of breathing difficulties, the restraints were removed and officers applied first aid while calling an ambulance. The man lost consciousness at the scene and despite being reanimated by a medical attendant, he was pronounced dead at the hospital. The deceased's mother contradicts reports that her son admitted to being under the influence of heroin and ecstasy, instead claiming he was drunk and only argued with passerby, also saying her son suffered from a partial spinal fusion and should not have been fixated. No one was charged.
2023-08-18	D., Rainer	56	Duisburg	Nordrhein-Westfalen	A mentally ill man was supposed to be taken from his apartment in Neuenkamp into psychiatric treatment, but heavily resisted against the paramedics. When police were called to aid the situation, they were attacked by the man in the stairwell. After taser usage failed due to malfunction, the attacker was shot three times, dying at the scene despite immediate resuscitation attempts.
2023-10-11	N.N.	30	Delbrück	Nordrhein-Westfalen	Police were called about a missing person case, a psychologically unstable man who had previously voiced suicidal intention. A 27-year old police officer eventually found the man and upon calling out to him, the man pulled out a knife and approached the officer, who then shot him four times, fatally hitting him in the head.
2023-11-05	N.N.	41	Köln	Nordrhein-Westfalen	A Croatian national under the influence of cocaine was rampaging inside an apartment building in Altstadt after being denied service by a prostitute he hired due to lacking cash and instead attempting to pay her in recently invalidated kuna. He was shot with a taser by SEK. An emergency physician sedated the man during the ambulance ride, after which he lost consciousness and died at a hospital.
2023-11-20	N.N.	25	Delmenhorst	Niedersachsen	A resident called police after seeing a man damaging a car with an axe in a nearby parking lot. The man then tried to attack the responding officers and was shot once by a 27-year old officer as a result, dying of his injuries at a hospital six days later. It was found that the attacker had injured a 32-year-old man in the same apartment building with the same weapon during an argument just minutes before.
2023-12-01	N.N.	37	Bad Schwalbach	Hessen	A woman called police to report her husband for domestic violence. During the response, an officer shot the unarmed man in the leg, leading to his death at a hospital the next day. No details have been given as to why the firearm was used.
2023-12-07	N.N.	36	Köln	Nordrhein-Westfalen	A man from Euskirchen unsuccessfully tried to carjack a 28-year old woman at knifepoint in Bickendorf. He then fled and entered a taxi, threatening the driver to start the car, but the cabby refused to do and instead stepped out. As the man climbed into the driver's seat, he was confronted by two police officers alerted by the first victim. After ignoring an order to put down the knife, an officer shot him once in the chest and while on the ground, the man cut his own throat open. He was brought to a hospital where he died shortly after. An autopsy showed that both the gunshot and the knife wound were fatal.
2023-12-23	Özkan, Ertekin	49	Mannheim	Baden-Württemberg	A man with suspected mental issues called police to report that he had committed a crime, saying that he had cut himself with a knife and falsely claiming that there was a dead body in his flat in Schönau. Three police officers were sent to investigate and encountered the man, shirtless, bloodied, and holding a knife, in front of the apartment building. Phone video showed police squad cars cordoning off the scene to numerous bystanders as the officers repeatedly ordered the man to put down the weapon and when he began walking towards police, the man was shot four times in the torso. He was then handcuffed before first aid was applied. The man's 18-year-old daughter later alleged that police had prevented close relatives who wanted to talk her father down from nearing the scene. The death was heavily criticized and reported on in Turkey, as the man, born in Mannheim, was of Turkish descent and citizenship. Protests in Mannheim and Turkey demanded an investigation of the officers involved.

== 2024 ==
Date (YYYY-MM-DD)	Name	Age	Place	State	Summary of events
2024-01-06	Barry, Ibrahima	23	Mülheim	Nordrhein-Westfalen	A Guinean man was causing a disturbance in his room in a refugee accommodation, reportedly because he was about to face deportation for aggressive behaviour and due to doubts about his background. The man bit two officers before fleeing into the courtyard. Police fired two taser shots at him, but as this did not seem to incapacitate him, the officers physically wrestled him to the ground. Officers forced the man to wear an anti-spit mask, claiming he had attempted to swallow stones, after which he lost consciousness. Despite being reanimated in an ambulance, he died at the scene. An autopsy found that he had consumed cocaine shortly before his death and also suffered from COPD and right-sided heart failure. In March 2026, nine police officers involved in the arrest were charged for using excessive and potentially deadly force by restraining the deceased with cable ties and forcing him to remain in a prone position. The officers were found not guilty on all charges on 30 September 2026.
2024-01-30	N.N.	40	Frankfurt am Main	Hessen	A mentally ill man with dual Spanish/Argentinian citizenship stabbed two women near the riverside in Sachsenhausen, injuring both in the face and neck. He was shot at least four times and died at the scene, with a ricocheting bullet also injuring an uninvolved 21-year-old man.
2024-03-30	Touray, Lamin	46	Nienburg	Lower Saxony	A Gambian man threatened his girlfriend with a knife, who then called the emergency line, requesting medical help for an immediate psychiatric issue. Police were sent in instead and while the officers attempted to calm the man in the yard, he stabbed a police dog and then walked towards police. The man was killed with two shots, with another six shots fired afterwards. A richocet or bullet fragment injured a female officer, who was airlifted to a hospital. Two days earlier, the man had injured three police officers with a knife after he was booked for driving without a licence in Harburg, reportedly shouting "Allahu Akbar" during the attack. An arrest warrant from the prosecutor's office had been denied by the district court because he didn't have a prior criminal record. An investigation into the shooting was ended in September 2024.
2024-04-03	N.N.	52	Dortmund	Nordrhein-Westfalen	A homeless man was seen attacking another vagrant with a 2.5 meter metal bar before he began hitting the entrance door to the St. Reinold's Church. Arriving police used multiple taser shots on him, to no effect. The man then attacked an officer, and as they were struggling for the weapon, another fired a single shot that struck the attacker, who died at a hospital. The incident was captured on video by bystanders.
2024-04-18	Zimmermann, Ronny	39	Ginsheim-Gustavsburg	Hessen	A squad car was responding to a traffic accident in which a 61-year-old cyclist was dragged under the wheels of a construction truck; she was air-lifted to a hospital and died the next day. While driving there, the police vehicle swerved to avoid a collision with a car that was entering the street, but instead struck a man driving a scooter, who died from his injuries at the scene. The police car continued to speed over the sidewalk and broke through a fence before crashing into a wall. The driver of the police car, as well as the 25-year-old woman who drove the other car involved, are being investigated by the state.
2024-04-23	N.N.	31	Mannheim	Baden-Württemberg	A man from Saarbrücken who had been barred from entering the library of the University of Mannheim for harassment and slapping a librarian was spotted putting up stickers for his YouTube channel. After an employee told him to stop, the man threatened him with a machete, after which he entered an active lecture hall to put up more stickers. Students and staff intervened, during which a struggle ensued. After police was called, an officer confronted the man and ordered him to drop the weapon. He was shot after taking a step towards the officer and died at a hospital.
2024-04-30	N.N.	38	Landstuhl	Rheinland-Pfalz	A man was rampaging in his apartment and cutting himself with a knife. When police were called, they were attacked by the man, who was shot with a taser. He lost consciousness afterwards and died at a hospital a day later.
2024-05-15	C., Gwen	23	Mauloff	Hessen	23-year-old federal police officer Lukas F. shot his girlfriend during an argument over the officer's alcoholism. He was arrested the same evening and charged with manslaughter. The officer has since maintained that the killing was "accidental" and that he was drunk on whiskey cola at the time of the incident. In September 2025, he was convicted of murder and sentenced to life imprisonment.
2024-06-13	K., Dirk	51	Hamburg	Hamburg	A man set his 81-year-old father on fire while he was sleeping in their apartment in Rahlstedt. Neighbours called police after hearing the father shouting for help in the staircase and when officers arrived, they were shot at by the suspect standing on the balcony. SEK engaged him in a shootout, during which the man was shot, dying at a hospital during the night. The father was treated at the scene and survived with critical burn wounds after emergency surgery. It was reported that the man, who had been living with his father since his 2023 break-up with his girlfriend, had suffered a mental health crisis in the hours before, having run naked through the street before his father calmed him down.
2024-06-14	N.N.	27	Wolmirstedt	Sachsen-Anhalt	An Afghan asylum seeker trespassed on a property that was holding a party for the start of the 2024 UEFA Championship and wounded three people, aged 50, 75, and 53, with a sharp object, leaving the former two with heavy injuries. He fled the scene and ran into a police patrol, whom he also attacked. Two officers each fired one shot at the man, who died at a hospital the next morning. It was found that the deceased had murdered a 23-year-old fellow Afghan with the same weapon shortly before the attacks. Investigators stated that he then aimlessly wandered the area and had threatened passing cars and another group in an allotment shortly before targeting the party at random.
2024-06-30	Z., Mohammad	34	Lauf	Bayern	An Iranian man approached a parked federal police van with three officers inside and repeatedly pulled at the locked door while hitting the vehicle. The officers exited and pepper sprayed him after he insulted them, at which point he pulled out a knife and attacked. A policewoman fired a warning shot before shooting the man in the stomach. The attacker died on the scene despite immediate first aid. He was a tolerated refugee and reportedly had a prior criminal record for resisting arrest and possessing narcotics. Based on interviews with his social workers, investigators dismissed religious extremism as a motive and instead speculate that he had been depressed due to his failure to obtain access to pre-med studies on account of his denied asylum status and drug addiction since his immigration to Germany, and that the attack was a suicide by cop, possibly inspired by the Mannheim stabbing a month earlier, where the perpetrator was shot by police, albeit non-fatally.
2024-07-23	N.N.	5	Kassel	Hessen	A police car with its siren on was driving through Nord-Holland when it accidentally struck a boy crossing the street. The child had pulled away from his mother and died of his injuries at the scene.
2024-07-31	N.N.	39	Oberkirch	Baden-Württemberg	Police were alerted by a physician who said one of his patients had called him and threatened to kill himself. Officers arrived at the man's apartment, where they found him bleeding from a self-inflicted injury and upon approaching the man to provide first aid, he threw a knife at them and tried to lunge at police with another knife. Officers fired multiple shots and the man was struck once, dying at the scene despite immediate resuscitation attempts. The man had a prior criminal record for violent crimes and drug possession.
2024-08-19	H., Christine	31	München	Bayern	A woman who had stabbed and injured a man during an argument with her parents and a family friend in Ludwigsvorstadt was found shortly after in a supermarket in Sendling by four police officers after a female passerby reported the assault. The woman threatened them with a knife and after pepper spray failed to incapacitate her, both officers opened fire, shooting her four times. She died at the scene. The deceased had multiple criminal charges for assault and drug crime, as well as a psychiatric history, having been diagnosed with borderline personality disorder and involuntarily committed three times on grounds of "posing danger to herself and others" in the past. The same day, the deceased had sent a message to a friend stating that "I think today there will be dead" and "someone should pray we'll survive".
2024-08-27	M., Nils	26	Moers	Nordrhein-Westfalen	A man was reported for insulting and attacking passerby on a street in Repelen by punching and kicking at them. When police arrived, the man pulled out two large knives and began walking towards them. Officers fired seven shots after the man ignored repeated orders to drop the weapons, hitting him twice in the torso, dying at the scene despite immediate first aid. The man was mentally ill, having been twice confined to a mental institution in the last two years, with a neighbor attesting that he had been regularly "throwing fits" in the past two weeks.
2024-08-28	N.N.	33	Recklinghausen	Nordrhein-Westfalen	Police were called due to a man rampaging at his mother's apartment in Suderwich after injuring his father with a knife in a family argument. The family had reportedly calmed their son down, but he became incensed upon seeing police and charged at them. Two officers fired five shots him, with three striking the man, including one in the neck that proved fatal. Testimony by the parents and a medical examination showed that the deceased had attempted suicide before police arrival.
2024-08-31	N.N.	46	Berlin	Berlin	A man was spotted by residents of a camping trailer site exiting the women's bathroom and heading for the men's bathroom. Upon being confronted, the man pulled out a revolver and argued while using unspecified racial insults. A 49-year old man used a timber log to chase the attacker off, following him as he retreated to his flat in Nikolassee. SEK stormed his flat after obtaining a warrant, being met with immediate gunfire from the attacker. Officers fired 19 shots with at least 12 hitting and killing the man. The weapon was identified as a compressed air pistol. The deceased was under extended psychiatric home care at the time of the shooting, having been denied access to firearms when asked by his caretaker. Anti-Romani racism is also considered a factor, as the trailer park is locally known to be largely populated by Sinti and Roma.
2024-09-04	N.N.	42	Bonn	Nordrhein-Westfalen	Following an argument, a man stabbed and injured a 43-year old woman and a 32-year old man under a bridge used as a homeless encampment in Nordstadt. The suspect was located near a Burger King restaurant by police and was shot twice in the torso during his arrest after continuing to move, dying at a hospital after emergency surgery.
2024-09-05	Ibrahimović, Emrah	18	München	Bayern	2024 Munich shooting: A man was seen walking around the Israeli general consulate and the National Socialism Documentation Centre, armed with a bayonted repeating rifle. A shootout ensued when he opened fire on a police car and was shot a minimum of ten times by five police officers. Because the shooting occurred on the day that commemorates the 1972 Munich massacre and the deceased, an Austrian national of Bosnian descent, was a known Islamist who sympathized for Jabhat al-Nusra, investigators consider the incident an attempted terror attack; the consulate had been closed and empty due to a remembrance taking place for the anniversary. The attacker had been forbidden from owning weapons, but he had circumvented the order by buying the gun, a Swiss Karabiner 31, from an antique dealer the day of the shooting.
2024-10-11	B., Serhat	32	Bochum	Nordrhein-Westfalen	A schizophrenic man was rampaging in his apartment in Bochum-Linden and throwing items out of his window. Alerted police entered the apartment's floor, where the man assaulted them with a hammer. Officers stopped the attack by pulling out their sidearms and spoke to the man for several minutes, at which point he returned to his flat and began barricading the door. SEK was called to the scene due to concerns that there may be more weapons inside and during the following raid, the man was shot two times after attacking officers.
2024-10-20	N.N.	44	Dillingen	Saarland	Officers called to a noise complaint fired a taser on the suspect. The man died at a hospital the same day.
2024-10-21	N.N.	35	Gangelt	Nordrhein-Westfalen	A woman who had escaped from a psychiatric hospital was loudly shouting outside the residential area where she lived. SEK killed the woman with a single gunshot after she threatened officers with a pair of scissors and an unspecified sharp instrument, either a knife or a glass shard.
2024-10-24	N.N.	20	Schwalmstadt	Hessen	A car drove up to a police station and when four officers approached the vehicle, the driver stepped out and aimed a gun at police, who immediately fired on the woman, hitting her twice. The woman died despite immediate first aid in an ambulance. She had a prior criminal history for DUI, hit-and-run, check fraud and violations to car insurance agreements. Investigators say that the woman had been arrested at the same station the prior night for drunk driving and let go after a blood sample was taken. The gun she used was found to be an airsoft replica.
2024-10-27	N.N.	42	Ulm	Baden-Württemberg	A man was rampaging in the apartment he shared with his mother, after which he was fixated by police. He collapsed and died in a hospital despite reanimation attempts.
2024-11-02	O., Thomas	51	Nürnberg	Bayern	Police responded to a call about an escalating domestic argument at an apartment in Schoppershof. Upon arrival, officers found a man threatening his 41-year-old girlfriend with a knife. He was shot by two police officers after he did not listen to demands to put down the weapon.
2024-11-05	N.N.	51	Bühlertann	Baden-Württemberg	Police were called about a man throwing items out of his window. He assaulted arriving officers, lightly injuring one, and was in-turn beaten with batons, pepper sprayed, and fixated to the ground. The man was administered a sedative and collapsed some time later, dying at a hospital.
2024-11-23	N.N.	34	Kamp-Lintfort	Nordrhein-Westfalen	Following a call about a noise complaint, a man wielding a keyring attacked and lightly injured the three responding officers in the stairwell of an apartment building. A 24-year-old officer fell down the stairs during the scuffle and then fired three shots on the attacker. Two struck the man who died at a hospital the next day.
2024-12-09	N.N.	35	Grassau	Bayern	A man called police to tell them that he was holding his mother hostage at their home in Mietenkam. After police knocked on the front door, the man charged at the officers with a knife and was shot once in the torso, dying at the scene. The man had a prior criminal record for violent offenses.
2024-12-18	N.N.	35	Göttingen	Niedersachsen	A woman called police after she was pushed and beaten by a man on the street in Geismar. Police were attacked with a knife by the suspect, who injured two officers with cuts to the torso. He was shot three times and died at the scene from a shot to the throat. Due to the random nature of the initial attack, it is presumed that the man, later identified as a drug addict, was mentally ill.
2024-12-24	N.N.	29	Duisburg	Nordrhein-Westfalen	A man under the influence of drugs behaved aggressively at a hotel and was tied-up by police after threatening paramedics. He lost consciousness and died two days later. The man had already been arrested for disorderly conduct at a hotel and was sent to a clinic by officers for rehab and treatment of bleeding facial injuries, but checked himself out only hours later.
2024-12-31	W., Tino	38	Tauberbischofsheim	Baden-Württemberg	An ex-employee at a construction company in Grünsfeld stole an excavator, destroyed on-site equipment and went on a rampage drive on B290. Heading into town, the driver rammed into buildings and vehicles, lightly injuring three police officers and causing at least 1 million euro in property damage. Police fired several shots on the vehicle before shooting the driver twice when he was about to ram into a car dealership. A salary dispute with his former employer, who also owned the dealership, and personal issues due to an ongoing divorce were determined to be possible causes.

== 2025 ==
Date (YYYY-MM-DD)	Name	Age	Place	State	Summary of events
2025-01-13	K., Peter	48	Bruchsal	Baden-Württemberg	Police were supposed to carry out a court-ordered admission to a psychiatric hospital. Officers broke down the apartment door after knocks and ringing was not answered and were immediately attacked by the tenant wielding a knife and hatchet. He was shot once and died at the scene. An investigation and potential civil case were being discussed as of February 2025, but ceased in December 2025 on grounds of self-defense.
2025-02-16	S., Christoph	48	Eichstetten am Kaiserstuhl	Baden-Württemberg	A 47-year-old woman called police because her husband had beaten her and their 10-year-old son, stating that he was actively threatening to kill them. While officers drove towards the area, the mother-son pair locked themselves inside a room, with the husband firing a gunshot that barely missed his son. After a neighbour rescued the child via ladder, the man then ran onto the street wielding a shotgun and pistol to confront arriving police. He ignored commands to drop the weapons and was shot multiple times for aiming the shotgun at them. The man died at a hospital the same night following emergency surgery. The deceased had a prior criminal record for assault and narcotic offenses, and was banned from owning firearms. He was the stepfather of footballer Kenneth Schmidt.
2025-03-04	A., Qabel	38	Nürnberg	Bayern	A Kuwaiti-born Iraqi Mandaean man was supposed to be arrested for an assault warrant at his apartment in Werderau. He resisted against officers and during the altercation, he grabbed a kitchen knife. He was shot, dying at the scene despite reanimation attempts.
2025-03-07	N.N.	26	Schönebeck	Sachsen-Anhalt	Two neighbours got into an argument in the stairwell of an apartment building. Police was called when one man began threatening the other with a knife. SEK fired three warning shots before shooting the knifeman, an Afghan national, who died the same morning at a hospital. The threatened victim, a 26-year-old German national, and officers were unharmed.
2025-03-11	O., Markus	61	Darmstadt	Hessen	Police accompanied social services to a house in Waldkolonie. The occupant refused to let them in and was shot after pointing a gun through an open window. He died at the scene from his injuries.
2025-03-14	Boubaker, Nejib	70	Dortmund	Nordrhein-Westfalen	Emergency services were called to an apartment in Scharnhorst where a Tunisian-born German man had reportedly suffered an epileptic seizure. After being treated and stabilised, the patient became aggressive when paramedics told him to come to a hospital and threatened the ambulance driver with a kitchen knife. Police were called to assist, but upon arrival, the man, less than three metres away, walked towards officers with the knife drawn. A 24-year-old officer shot the man in the stomach. He was resucitated but died two hours later in an ambulance on the scene. Neighbours contradicted police descriptions of the deceased "rampaging" and deny that he had run at police, pointing out that he was known to have a severe limp.
2025-03-17	N.N.	51	Herne	Nordrhein-Westfalen	Police were called to fulfill a welfare check on a man in Röhlinghausen who had failed to show up to his workplace. Upon arrival, the man threw several items, including glass and a jar filled with marijuana, from a window above, breaking the windshield of the police car. When officers entered the apartment floor, the man was in the process of threatening a neighbour with a knife before he charged at police. An officer fired four shots, two of which struck the attacker in the abdomen and chest, the latter of which was fatal. A search of his apartment found drugs inside.
2025-03-23	N.N.	36	Ostfildern	Baden-Württemberg	A man fatally stabbed his 39-year-old ex-girlfriend, who had a restraining order against him, and fled in his car. Police stopped the man during a traffic check, after which he ran away on foot. Officers gave a verbal command to stop and a warning shot before shooting the man in the leg. He later died at a hospital and while the cause of death was attributed to self-inflicted knife wounds to the chest, the inner ministry of Baden-Württemberg counts the death in police shooting death statistics.
2025-04-09	N.N.	48	Schramberg	Baden-Württemberg	A mental hospital in Rottweil reported that an in-patient for substance abuse had escaped the premises. Police launched a search and found the man hours later in the garden of his apartment. Officers were threatened with a gun and fatally shot the man after he ignored commands to lay down the weapon. The gun was identified as a gas pistol. The deceased had several convictions for theft, assault and drug crimes.
2025-04-11	N.N.		Klettbach	Thüringen	A 49-year-old police officer fatally shot his wife and their two teenage children with his sidearm before killing himself.
2025-04-11	N.N.		Klettbach	Thüringen	A 49-year-old police officer fatally shot his wife and their two teenage children with his sidearm before killing himself.
2025-04-11	N.N.		Klettbach	Thüringen	A 49-year-old police officer fatally shot his wife and their two teenage children with his sidearm before killing himself.
2025-04-12	S., Shadi	43	Berlin	Berlin	A 29-year-old man was stabbed to death during an argument in Sophie-Charlotte-Platz U-Bahn station. The attacker fled onto the street, where police confronted him and shot him multiple times after he approached officers with the knife drawn. The man was reanimated at the scene and treated at a hospital, where he died the following morning. Both the deceased attacker, a Syrian national and the stabbing victim, a German national, had previous convictions for violent crimes and drug offences. The homeless attacker was supposed to be in jail due to a parole violation.
2025-04-16	N.N.	64	Hilzingen	Baden-Württemberg	A man with known alcohol problems was reported for aggressively harassing pedestrians in Binningen, including several children. Police were called when the man used an axe to strike the windows of a car with a woman and her child inside. The attacker left the parking lot without harming the mother and daughter, then attacked arriving police officers, lightly injuring a policewoman. The man was shot multiple times by two officers and died at the scene despite reanimation attempts.
2025-04-17	F., Emal	36	Hamburg	Hamburg	A mentally ill man under the influence of sedatives was reported for rampaging in his apartment in Billstedt. Police found the man on his balcony on the sixth floor, wielding a metal bar. The man eventually complied orders to drop the weapon, throwing it over the railing, but then threatened to commit suicide by jumping. To prevent this, several officers rushed the man and restrained him on the ground. During transport in a patrol car, an officer punched the handcuffed man in the head. The man lost consciousness and died at a hospital. The punch that occurred after the arrest was not disclosed for three weeks, and upon its discovery, the officer was put under investigation for the assault. An autopsy found that the deceased suffered a intracerebral hemorrhage, which, combined with the prone position during fixation, alcohol and drug intoxication and stress, inhibited breathing. The death was the seventh of its kind in Hamburg police custody since 2022.
2025-04-20	Adje, Lorenz	21	Oldenburg	Niedersachsen	Security at a disco denied a man entry for not abiding by dress code. The man attacked the staff and patrons with pepper spray, injuring four people, before fleeing the scene. Witnesses and staff pursued the attacker, but relented after the man threatened them with a knife. The man avoided police before being confronted by a police car patrol. According to police, he approached officers in a threatening manner and used the same irritant gas on them. A 27-year-old officer fired five shots at the man, three striking his head, torso, and hip, with a fourth shot grazing the thigh. The man subsequently died of his injuries hours later at a hospital. The man had criminal procedures against him for assault, resisting arrest, robbery, and harassment at the time of his death. The killing was criticised as the deceased was of mixed Togolese-German descent. A knife was recovered from the deceased's pocket, but police were not threatened with it nor had they been aware of the weapon at the time of the shooting. Contrary to the initial report, which indicated that the shots were fired in self-defence, the man had been shot from behind. The bodycams of the officers were turned off against regulations. In July 2026, the district court accepted a motion for trial.
2025-05-05	N.N.	71	Schlierbach	Baden-Württemberg	A man threatened his 56-year-old wife with a knife during a presumed mental health crisis. The woman was able to flee, after which her husband barricaded himself in their home. SEK stormed the premises and shot the man with a taser. The man suffered a severe spinal injury, dying at a hospital in August. A preliminary investigation against the involved officers was opened.
2025-05-14	N.N.	37	Lahr	Baden-Württemberg	A 30-year-old police officer shot his wife with his service weapon before killing himself. The couple had been separated.
2025-05-31	N.N.	47	Schirnding	Bayern	A motorist was stopped by federal police for a random traffic check as part of increased border control efforts near the Czech–German border. The man fled on foot and opened fire on pursuing officers, who fatally shot him. The deceased, an Iranian national from Mannheim, was found to have been carrying around 100 grams of crystal meth and it's assumed that he was caught returning from a manufacturing site in the Czech Republic.
2025-06-07	K., Glorya	30	München	Bayern	A Bulgarian-born Macedonian woman attacked two people in separate incidents in Schwanthalerhöhe. She first injured a 56-year-old neighbour in their apartment building, having rang the man's doorbell before punching him in the chest with a knife in her fist. The attacker then stabbed a 25-year-old woman on a nearby street before running from the scene; both victims were left with light wounds. The woman approached and threatened several passersby while walking through the streets. During an arrest attempt in Isarvorstadt, the woman ran at two police officers with the knife drawn and was shot multiple times, dying at a hospital the same evening. One officer fired five shots while the other fired four. The neighbour and police said that the woman was known to be mentally ill. The same day, she had been reported for rampaging at a store and was restrained when she behaved aggressively to responding officers. She had been released due to a lack of criminal action 30 minutes before the first attack.
2025-06-26	K., Bilal	27	Wangen	Baden-Württemberg	Two police officers arrived at an apartment to fetch an Afghan man who had been sentenced to a prison term for an assault conviction. The man attacked officers with a knife, severely injuring one with several cuts to the face and arms, before the attacker was shot five times, dying at the scene. An investigation determined self defense in April 2026.
2025-07-01	N.N.	29	Stuttgart	Baden-Württemberg	Two Algerian nationals were fighting inside a bar in Stuttgart-Ost, which ended with one man stabbing the other in the neck with a glass shard. The attacker fled the scene and was found hiding in a bush inside a courtyard by a police officer. The officer ordered the man to put his hands behind his back, and after another verbal warning, the man jumped over a fence. The officer fired a single gunshot, fatally striking the man who died despite reanimation attempts. The deceased had illegally entered Germany on 26 June and given the false age of 18. The 29-year-old stabbing victim survived with heavy injuries. An investigation determined self defense in March 2026.
2025-07-19	N.N.	44	Leonberg	Baden-Württemberg	Residents called police because a man was firing a gun from an upper-story building. The man shot at arriving officers before barricading himself in his apartment. SEK stormed the flat and shot the man after he threatened them with a firearm, which was identified as a pneumatic pistol.
2025-08-21	N.N.	40	Dresden	Sachsen	A man was reported for rampaging on his balcony and throwing items into the street. Police fixated him to the ground, during which he lost consciousness and died despite first aid.
2025-12-26	N.N.	33	Gießen	Hessen	A patient at the psychiatric ward of University Hospital of Giessen attacked a hospital worker with a folding knife during a mental health crisis. Upon police arrival, the patient attacked officers and after several verbal warnings and taser usage proved ineffective, he was mortally wounded by two gunshots to the chest and leg.

== 2026 ==
Date (YYYY-MM-DD)	Name	Age	Place	State	Summary of events
2026-02-10	N.N.	53	Waltrop	Nordrhein-Westfalen	A man threatened his sister and mother with a knife during a visit at the latter's apartment. Upon police arrival, the man continued behaving aggressively, due to which he was shot twice, dying at hospital. The deceased is believed to have been mentally ill and in a state of psychosis during the incident.
2026-04-05	N.N.	22	Saarbrücken	Rheinland-Pfalz	A car with three occupants drove away from a police traffic check in Herrensohr. A car chase ensued and as the car made a turning maneuver to drive out of a cul de sac, a policewoman was struck and injured. Police ended up firing on the car during the pursuit, hitting the driver and a 19-year-old passenger in the backseat. The driver died of his injuries. An investigation into negligent homicide was opened, with hints that the driver was shot earlier than initially reported, while in the cul de sac and that the injury of the police officer was indirectly caused by an accidental reversing by the injured driver.
2026-05-04	Saleh, Qais	37	Memmingen	Bayern	Police entered an abandoned house as part of an overnight search for a missing 14-year-old boy who had disappeared on 2 May. Inside, officers discovered a man hiding in a closet. The man lunged at police with a knife before fleeing. A second search of the building found the body of the missing child, leading to a manhunt for the knifeman as a murder suspect. The man was located in town a few hours later, first running away before turning around and walking at an officer with the knife drawn. Following several verbal warnings, the man was shot several times. As he still clutched the knife, he was disarmed through the use of a riot shield, later dying at a hospital. The deceased, an ethnic Palestinian asylum seeker born in the Israeli-occupied West Bank, had been set for deportation since 2023, which was repeatedly delayed due to uncertainty about his citizenship and a lack of communications with both the Israeli and Palestinian governments. The suspect and the murdered boy were known to be befriended. Chat messages between the boy's family and Kripo during the initial disappearance showed that the latter suspected "a kidnapping under the influence of drugs and [in relation to] drug trade".
2026-05-11	N.N.	c. 40	Wangels	Schleswig-Holstein	A GSG 9 officer accidentally shot an instructor and fellow GSG 9 officer in the leg during a shooting exercise at the Bundeswehr military training area in Putlos, causing the instructor's death at a hospital. The shooter was determined to have mistakenly loaded live bullets rather than training rounds.
2026-05-18	N.N.	34	Wiesloch	Baden-Württemberg	A voluntary patient at a mental ward was behaving aggressively towards staff. After several orderlies and an on-site doctor were unable to calm the man down, police were called, who immediately forced the patient to the ground and fixated him. He resisted the fixation before losing consciousness and dying despite first aid. In June, an investigation was launched against five police officers and several hospital staff members for negligent homicide.
2026-06-20	N.N.	41	Krefeld	Nordrhein-Westfalen	A man lightly injured a woman with a knife during a domestic dispute in Uerdingen. Two arriving police officers shot the man multiple times after he attempted to attack with the knife, causing his death at a hospital the following morning.
2026-07-01	N.N.	43	Remscheid	Nordrhein-Westfalen	Police were called after passersby saw a man threatening two girls with pepper spray. Upon police arrival the man sprayed the substance at the officers before fleeing on foot. A taser was fired by police, but missed the target. Police fatally shot the man when he threw a crowbar and a hammer at the officers.
2026-07-02	N.N.	66	Guxhagen	Hessen	A man was sought out at his home in Wollrode after a witness identified him in a drunk driving incident. The man was shot after threatening officers with a gas pistol. He was charged with two counts of drunk driving and one count of threat, but died of his injuries on 20 July while hospitalized in Kassel.
2026-07-18	N.N.	17	Hanau	Hessen	A police car struck and killed a teenager in Großauheim. The two officers had been on patrol for reports of a male figure who had repeatedly jaywalked over the road, which may or may not have been the later deceased. The officers are being investigated to negligent homicide.
2026-07-19	N.N.	37	Duisburg	Nordrhein-Westfalen	Police were called to an apartment complex in Neuenkamp due to a tenant rampaging inside his bathroom. Officers subdued the man and bound his hands and feet, leaving him in a prone position. The man lost consciousness and died at the scene. An autopsy determined the cause of death as hypoxia, possibly compounded by intoxication. The six police officers involved in the death, as well as two medical personnel, are being investigated for bodily harm resulting in death.
2026-07-26	Ballout, Abdul Rahman Toufic	21	Berlin	Berlin	2026 Berlin Pride van attack: A fugitive was wanted for involvement in a vehicle-ramming and stabbing attack in the Tiergarten at the annual Christopher Street Day, which had resulted in the death of a Polish national and 31 injuries. He was tracked down to a gazebo in a garden area in Spandau following a tip-off and shot when he ran at SEK officers with a bladed weapon, dying at the scene despite reanimation attempts. The deceased, a German national of Lebanese descent, had several convictions for violent crime committed as a juvenile. Since 2021, he was known as an Islamist, having been imprisoned in Lebanon for attempting to join ISIS before receiving a suspended prison sentence in Germany following extradition. An Iranian national was arrested as an accomplice, but later released. A DNA analysis of the van showed the deceased was the driver and only occupant, though other co-conspirators are not ruled out.
2026-08-11	N.N.	47	Bielefeld	Nordrhein-Westfalen	A woman called police to request the arrest of her boyfriend, whom she had locked inside their apartment in Bielefeld-Mitte after he displayed signs of mental distress for several days. He had recently begun acting aggressively with her while wielding a gun and threatening a suicide by cop. After police closed off the area and requested SEK, officers spoke with the man, who had since come outside. During the conversation, the man pulled out a gun and aimed at officers, who fired multiple gunshots in response, killing him. The deceased, a Croatian national, had a prior history for illegal weapons possession and drug crime.
2026-09-17	N.N.	35	Heringen	Thüringen	A police squad car containing two officers struck and killed a cyclist on the K27 county road at Uthleben. A negligent homicide investigation was opened.
2026-09-29	N.N.	24	Hürth	Nordrhein-Westfalen	A police van was simulating an emergency response scenario on a public street when it collided with a scooter, killing its driver. The van had run a red light at the crossroad just before the incident. The four police officers inside the van sustained light injuries.
2026-10-08	F., Shakib	27	Tuttlingen	Baden-Württemberg	Employees of the town hall called police after an interaction with an Afghan man armed with a pistol who had since left the building to loiter around in an inner courtyard. When officers encountered him sitting on a bench, the man allegedly shot at police, at which point he was killed by returning fire. The deceased had a prior criminal record for theft, assault, and property damage, with recent investigations into ties to the drug dealing scene. He had immigrated as an unaccompanied minor but was slated for deportation since 2018, with acquaintances stating that the deceased had voiced a desire to leave Germany for another country, including his native Afghanistan, after experiencing mental health issues around 2021. He had been in the process of obtaining a valid Afghan passport for this purpose with the aid of Tuttlingen authorities since early 2026.

== See also ==
- Lists of killings by law enforcement officers
- Use of firearms by police in Germany
- List of killings by law enforcement officers in post-reunification Germany (1990s)
- List of killings by law enforcement officers in post-reunification Germany (2000s)
- List of killings by law enforcement officers in post-reunification Germany (2010s)
