= Pepperl+Fuchs =

German-based automation company

Pepperl+Fuchs SE

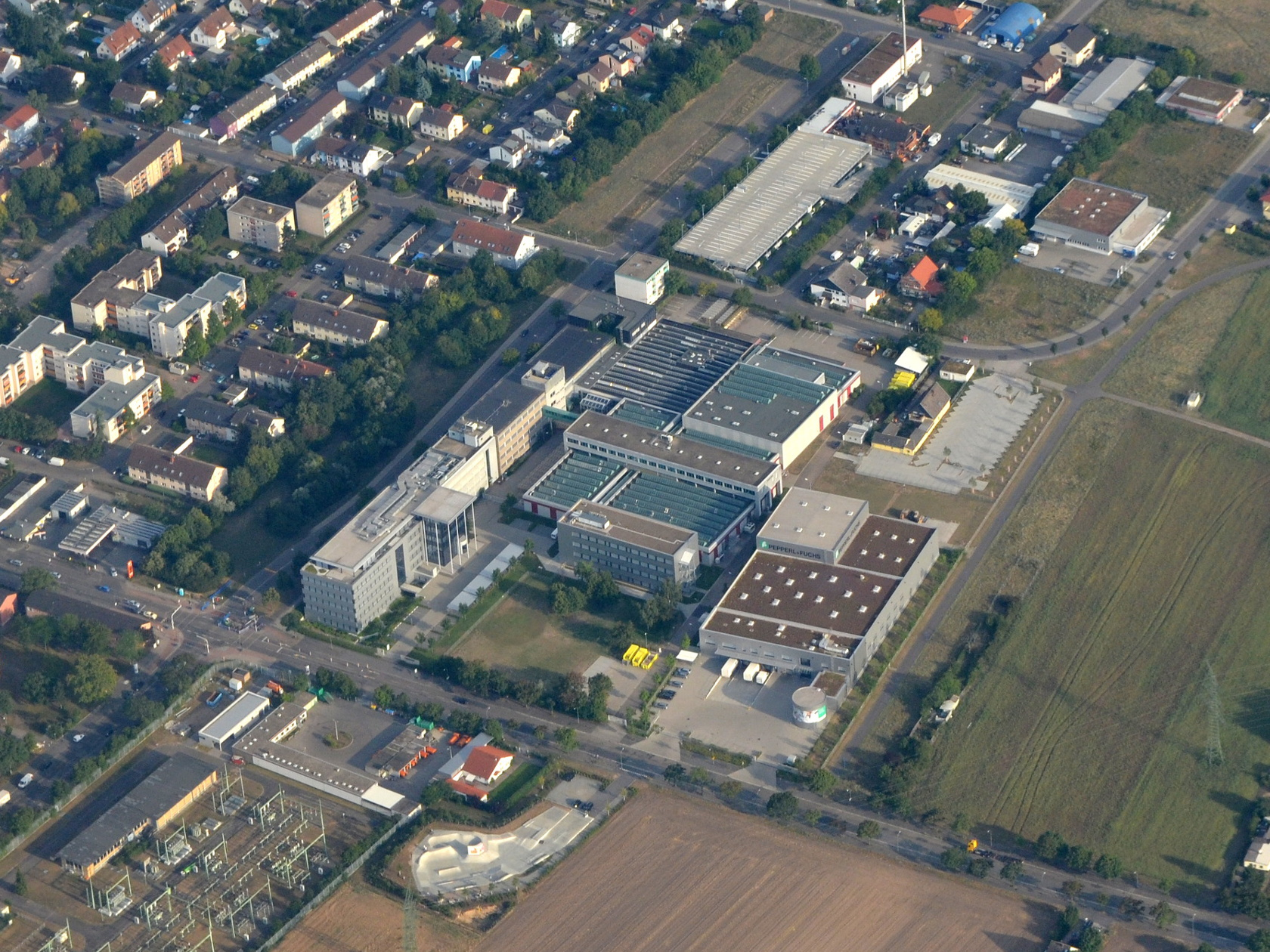
- Headquarters in Schönau, Germany
- Type: Societas Europea
- Industry: Factory automation; mobile computing & communication; process automation; sensor manufacturing
- Founded: 1945 in Sandhofen, Mannheim, Germany
- Founders: Walter Pepperl; Ludwig Fuchs
- Headquarters: Schönau, Mannheim, Germany
- Number of locations: 5 manufacturing locations (2026)
- Area served: Worldwide
- Key people: Dr. Wilhelm Nehring (Chairman); Tobias Blöcher; Reiner Müller; Florian Ochs; Martin Walter
- Products: Enterprise Mobility; Hazardous Area Products & Solutions; Industrial Communication & Interfaces; Industrial Sensors
- Brands: Bebco EPS; ecom; Polyplan; Neoception; VMT
- Revenue: >1 billion EUR (2022)
- Number of employees: 6,850 (2024)
- Subsidiaries: >40
- Website: pepperl-fuchs.com

Pepperl+Fuchs SE (sometimes referenced by the initialism P+F) is a multinational company headquartered in Mannheim, Germany that develops industrial sensors, industrial communication and interfaces, enterprise mobility, and hazardous area products and solutions.

In 2022, the company's revenue exceeded €1 billion for the first time.

As of April 2024, the company had approximately 6,850 employees worldwide, with more than 40 foreign subsidiaries on six continents, and manufacturing facilities in Singapore, Hungary, Indonesia, Vietnam, and Czech Republic. A new US headquarters opened in 2025.

== History ==
Pepperl+Fuchs was founded in 1945 by Walter Pepperl and Ludwig Fuchs in Mannheim. The company initially operated as a workshop for repairing radio equipment while simultaneously manufacturing transformers. By 1948, Pepperl+Fuchs had expanded to produce other electronics, leading to the development of the first inductive proximity switch, an electronic device capable of measuring the position of objects and commonly used in packaging and filling systems, in 1958. Alongside this, Pepperl+Fuchs also created the first transistor amplifier with an intrinsically safe control circuit.

Increasing demand for the proximity switch prompted Pepperl+Fuchs to expand its focus into areas such as sensing technology, intrinsic safety, and explosion protection technology, Starting in the 1970s, the company established subsidiaries for production and sales in countries including China, India, Indonesia, Italy, Singapore, Hungary, and the United States. During this period, Pepperl+Fuchs transitioned from a general partnership into a GmbH & Co. KG.

In 1987, the two founders retired from the management team and the legal form of the company was changed to a limited liability entity.

Initially based in Mannheim-Sandhofen, the headquarters of Pepperl+Fuchs moved to Schönau in 1971. In Germany, the company also operates in Neuhausen ob Eck, where all of its rotary encoders are designed and manufactured. In Asia, production occurs in various locations, including Vietnam.

Since the 1990s, Pepperl+Fuchs has expanded through numerous mergers and acquisitions.

In 2000, manufacturing started in Bintan, Indonesia.

In 2007, one of the company’s largest production facilities opened in Ho Chi Minh City, Vietnam. The building expanded in 2023.

The company opened the European Distribution Center in Mannheim in 2012.

Two years later, Solution Engineering Centers (SEC) were launched worldwide to develop and supply tailor-made solutions for explosion control.

In 2019, Pepperl+Fuchs changed its legal structure from Gesellschaft mit beschränkter Haftung (GmbH) to Aktiengesellschaft (AG) and again in 2020 to Societas Europea (SE).

In 2023, the company attained IEC 62443-4-1 cybersecurity certification.

As of April 2024, the company had approximately 6,850 employees worldwide, with more than 40 foreign subsidiaries on six continents, and manufacturing facilities in Germany, USA, Singapore, Hungary, China, Indonesia, and Vietnam.

== Product Portfolios ==
Industrial Sensors includes LiDAR, photoelectric, proximity, RFID, and ultrasonic.

Industrial Communication and Interfaces includes IO-Link devices, multiport serial cards, and power supplies.

Enterprise Mobility includes smartphones, tablets, and headsets for industrial and hazardous areas.

Hazardous Area Products and Solutions includes intrinsic safety barriers, industrial PCs and monitors (HMI), and purge and pressurization systems.

== Mergers & Acquisitions ==
In 1991, Pepperl+Fuchs acquired the company RUF in Mannheim, Germany to add level control to its product range.

Five years later, the company acquired Hohner in Tuttlingen, Germany to add rotary encoders to its portfolio.

In 2001, Pepperl+Fuchs acquired Visolux.

In 2003, Pepperl+Fuchs acquired Bebco EPS, a manufacturer of purge and pressurization systems.

The following year, Pepperl+Fuchs acquired Omnitron AG to establish the new Data Matrix Code product area. Way-coding systems (WCS) were also added to the portfolio.

In 2005, Pepperl+Fuchs acquired Extec Oesterle GmbH to focus on display and operating systems for hazardous areas.

The next year, the company acquired the intrinsically safe instrumentation division of Cooper Crouse-Hinds GmbH and the SAS (separator alarm systems) business from OJ Electronics. It also purchased VMT Vision Machine Technic Bildverarbeitungssysteme GmbH.

In 2010, Pepperl+Fuchs further expanded by acquiring Siemens' proximity switch business, enhancing its capabilities in ultrasonic sensor technology.

In 2015, Pepperl+Fuchs acquired Petroleum Safety Products Ind. in Chennai, India and MACtek Corporation in Twinsburg, Ohio.

Two years later, the company acquired ecom instruments to add hazardous area mobile computing to its portfolio.

In 2019, Pepperl+Fuchs acquired Comtrol Corporation, a US company specializing in Ethernet-based industrial communication and IO-Link master gateways. The Pepperl+Fuchs Comtrol Hospitality division offers a library of interfaces for property management systems and guest service systems. Pepperl+Fuchs Comtrol partnered with Callisto Integration, in the manufacturing industry.

In 2021, Pepperl+Fuchs acquired the Finnish company, Aava Mobile Oy, expanding its reach in the industrial tablet computer and smartphone industry.

== Cooperation & Sponsorships ==
Pepperl+Fuchs is actively involved in the Smart Factory initiative, collaborating with the Technical University of Kaiserslautern and other partners to advance automation and manufacturing technologies.

In May 2024 Pepperl+Fuchs signed a contract agreeing to partner with the Mannheim TECHNOSEUM to set up a student laboratory, centered on STEM programs and sensor technology.
