= Johanna Geissmar =

German-Jewish pediatrician

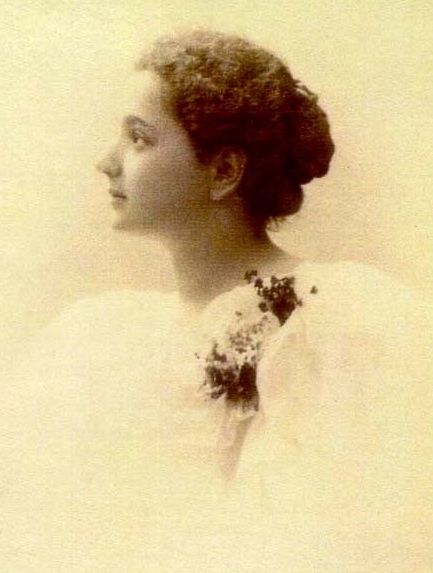
- Geissmar aged 19, photography from Conrad Ruf
- Born: Johanna Elsa Geissmar; 7 December 1877; Mannheim, Baden-Württemberg, Germany
- Died: 14 August 1942 (aged 64); Auschwitz concentration camp
- Education: Abitur
- Occupation: Pediatrician

Johanna Elsa Geissmar (7 December 1877 – 14 August 1942) was a German-Jewish pediatrician murdered by the Nazi regime during the Holocaust. She was called Angel in Hell by the patients she helped during her stay in Gurs internment camp from October 1940 to August 1942.

== Family ==
Johanna Geissmar was the youngest of six children of lawyer Josef Geissmar (16 October 1828 in Sinsheim - 3 October 1905 in Mannheim) and his wife Klara née Regensburger (20 April 1844 in Eppingen - 16 July 1911). Her ancestors included cantors and religious teachers. Her grandfather was David Geismar, the Rabbi of Sinsheim.

== Life ==
Johanna Geissmar went to a Lyceum in Mannheim. Studying at a university was out of the question then, as the universities were still closed for women. When Heidelberg University in 1900 started to admit women, Johanna decided to complete her secondary education and to obtain the Abitur at the Hohenbaden castle in Baden-Baden. In 1909, she began to study medicine in Heidelberg. During this time, she lived with her brother Jakob Geissmar, a judge, in Graimbergweg 1. She graduated in 1915 and then worked as a doctor in a hospital in Heidelberg. She was confronted with heavy injuries of soldiers of the First World War. From 1920 she practiced as a pediatrician in Heidelberg, first in Erwin-Rhode-Straße, later in Moltkestraße, where she also lived. From 1930, fewer and fewer patients came to Geissmar as a result of Nazi propaganda. On 1 April 1933, the Gauleitung called for the boycott of Jewish doctors. At the end of April 1933, Geissmar was deprived of her license and she had to close her practice.

After 28 August 1933, Geissmar moved to Bärental in the Black Forest. From 1935 she lived in Saig bei Lenzkirch. Her brother Friedrich Geissmar, also a physician, came to live with her. After the November Pogrom of 1938, Geissmar was physically attacked. She found refuge with her friend Erika Schwoerer, whose family was critical toward the Nazi regime. The living conditions of Jews became more and more menacing. Her friend turned to Martin Huss for help, a Protestant priest and member of the Confessing Church. But a protection was not possible. Johanna's brother took his life in the fall of 1940. Geissmar was arrested by the Gestapo and was brought to one of the collection centers during the Wagner Bürckel Operation on 23 October 1940. Then she was deported to the Gurs internment camp in southern France. There she was interned in the women's camp. Geissmar and nurse Pauline Maier took care of many sick and fainting patients as the living conditions in the camp were terrible and inhuman. Her tireless work in the camp led to the description Angel in Hell. In August 1942, she was transported to Auschwitz concentration camp. Although her name was not on the list, she joined the transport voluntarily, wanting to continue to care for her patients. She also hoped to find her brother Jakob and his wife, who were deported from Munich, in Auschwitz. The date of her arrival in Auschwitz-Birkenau is also the date of their death: 14 August 1942.

None of her siblings survived. Three siblings had already died before 1933. Jakob was murdered in Theresienstadt in 1943, his wife Elisabeth and her daughter Martha also became victims of the Shoah. Two nieces survived: Else Geissmar, the second daughter of Jakob and Elisabeth, emigrated to the US with her daughter Ruth in 1938. Berta Geissmar, the daughter of Leopold, fled to London in time.

== Remembrance ==
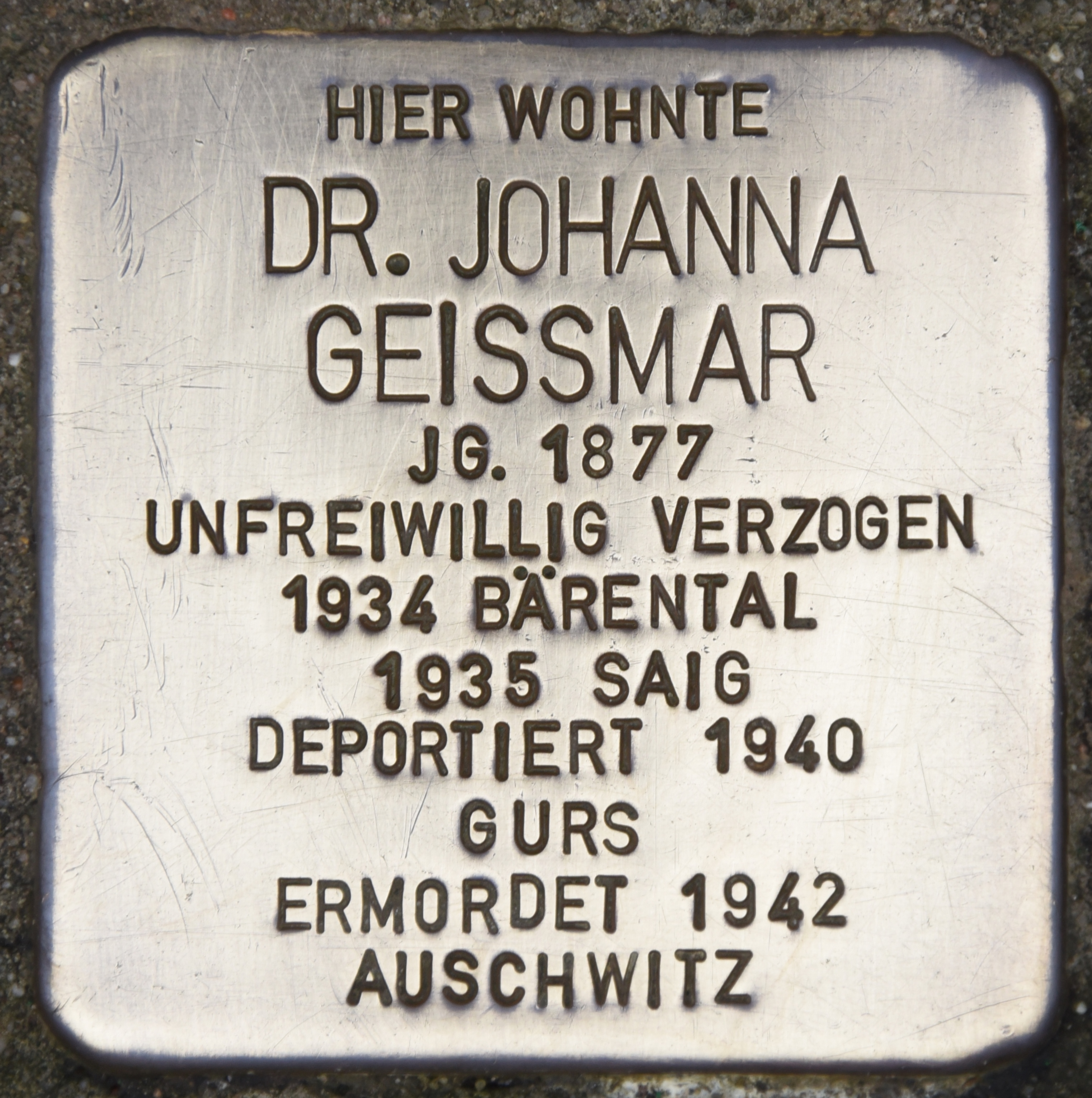
Stolperstein for Johanna Geissmar in Heidelberg

A commemorative plaque for Johanna Geissmar can be found on the building Hochfirstweg 25 in Lenzkirch-Saig where she once lived. Its inauguration took place on 30 May 2004.

The ZDF film Angel in Hell by Dietmar Schulz premiered on 31 January 2009. It is based entirely on the fate of Johanna Geissmar.

In 2013 the school conference of the Peter Petersen Gymnasium in Mannheim-Schönau, a high school, decided to rename the school with her name.

Since 2014 a Stolperstein in front of the House Moltkestrasse 6 in Heidelberg serves as a memorial of Johanna Geissmar.

== Literature ==
- Karl Diefenbacher (1984), Ortssippenbuch Eppingen im Kraichgau (in German), Lahr-Dinglingen: Interessengemeinschaft Badischer Ortssippenbücher (Deutsche Ortssippenbücher, Reihe A. Band 109) (Badische Ortssippenbücher. Band 52)
- Horst Ferdinand: Johanna Geissmar. In: Badische Biographien. Neue Folge 4/1996. S. 90−92.
- Richard Zahlten: Meine Schwester starb in Auschwitz. Gedenkbuch für Dr. Johanna Geißmar und ihre Familie. Johannis Verlag, Lahr 2000.
- Richard Zahlten: Dr. Johanna Geissmar: Von Mannheim nach Heidelberg und über den Schwarzwald durch Gurs nach Auschwitz-Birkenau. 1877-1942. Einer jüdischen Ärztin 60 Jahre danach zum Gedenken. Hartung-Gorre Verlag, Konstanz 2001, ISBN 3896496611.
