= Schönau (Mannheim) =

District in Mannheim, Baden-Württemberg, Germany

- Borough of Mannheim
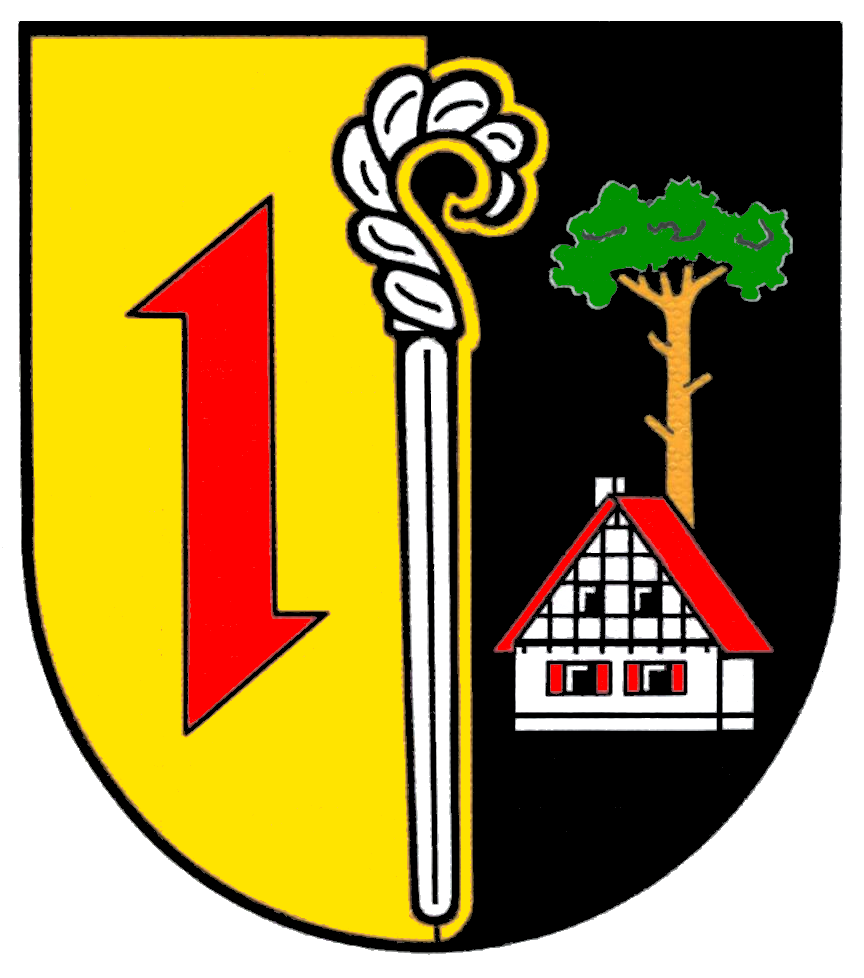
- Coat of arms
- Interactive map of Schönau
- Location within Germany Location within Baden-Württemberg
- Coordinates: 49°32′40″N 8°28′30″E
- Country: Germany
- State: Baden-Württemberg
- Admin. region: Karlsruhe
- District: Urban district
- City: Mannheim

Area
  - Total: 2.97 km^{2} (1.15 sq mi)

Population (2019-12-31)
  - Total: 12,493
  - Density: 4,210/km^{2} (10,900/sq mi)
- Time zone: UTC+01:00 (CET)
  - Summer (DST): UTC+02:00 (CEST)
- Postal codes: 68307
- Website: Official website

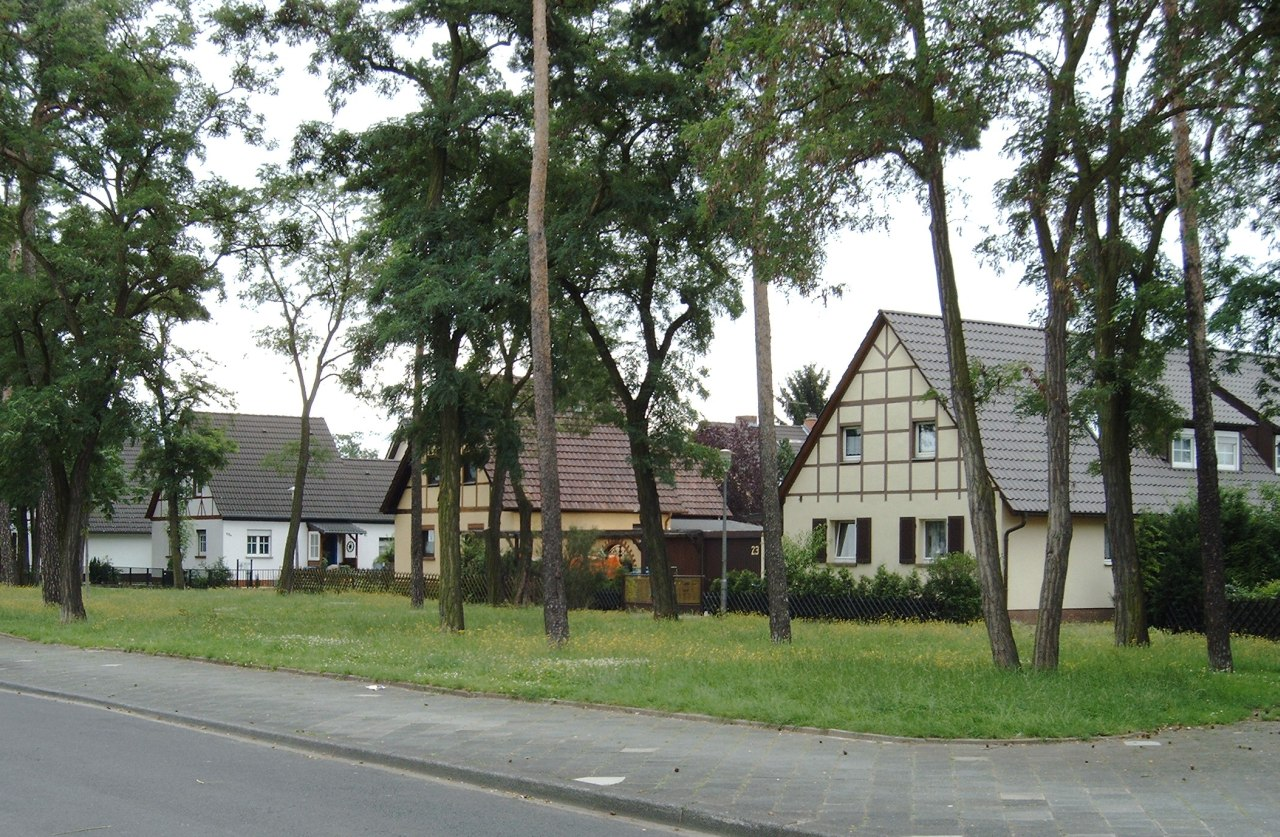
Settlement houses from the 1930s

Schönau (German pronunciation: [ˈʃøːnaʊ]) is a Stadtbezirk (borough) in the north of Mannheim, Baden-Württemberg, Germany. Covering an area of 2.97 km², it lies next to the Käfertaler Wald and has a population of 12,493 people as of December 31, 2019.

== Geography ==
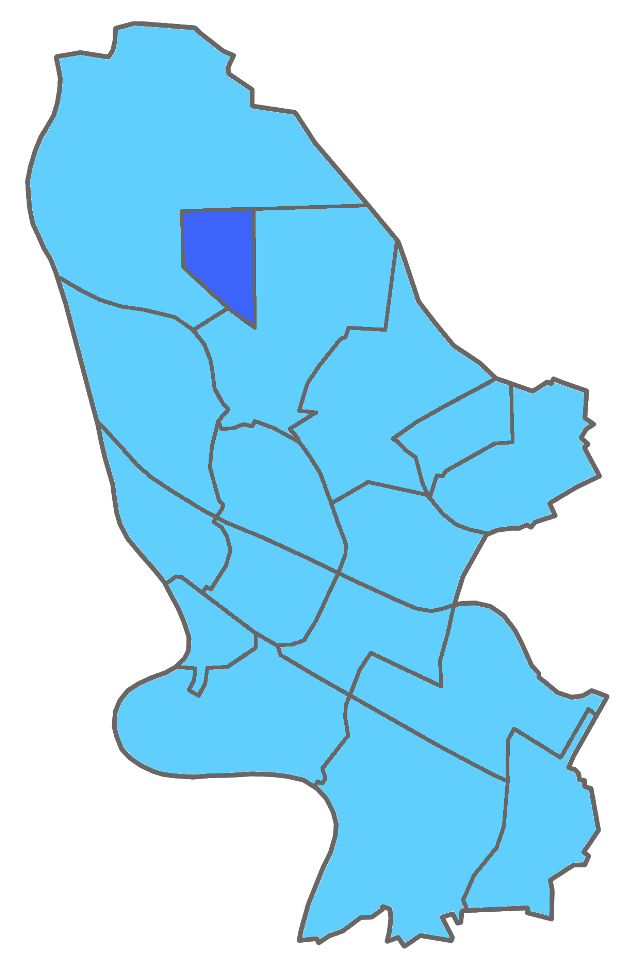
Map of Mannheim with Schönau highlighted

Schönau lies between the A 6 in the north, the marshalling yard of the Mannheim–Frankfurt railway line in the east and Frankenthaler Straße in the southwest. In the west lies Sandhofen, in the north Blumenau, in the east the Käfertaler Wald (forest), in the southeast Gartenstadt and in the south Waldhof. Schönau is more or less divided into three parts: housing developments in the south, the new development area in the north-east and the apartment blocks with social housing in the north-west.

== Sights ==
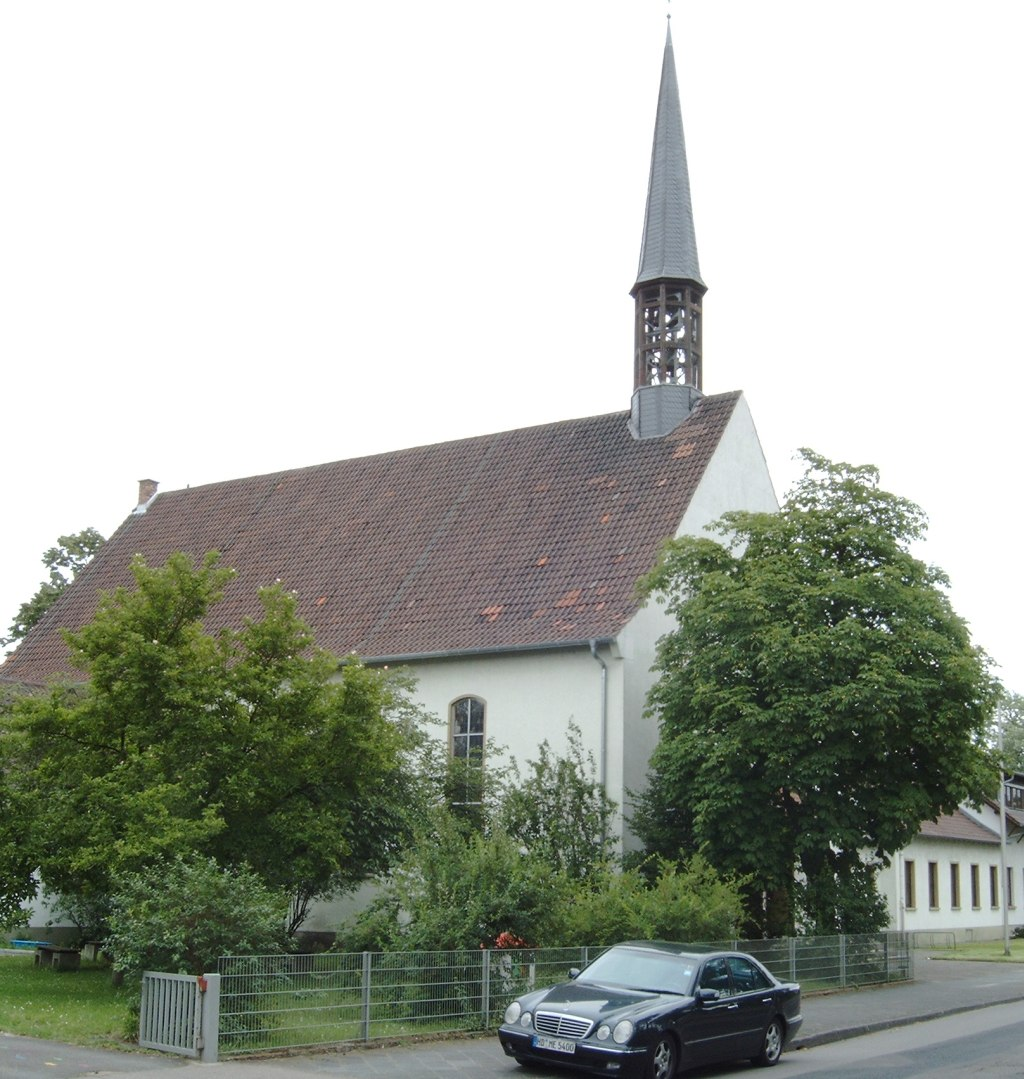
Emmauskirche

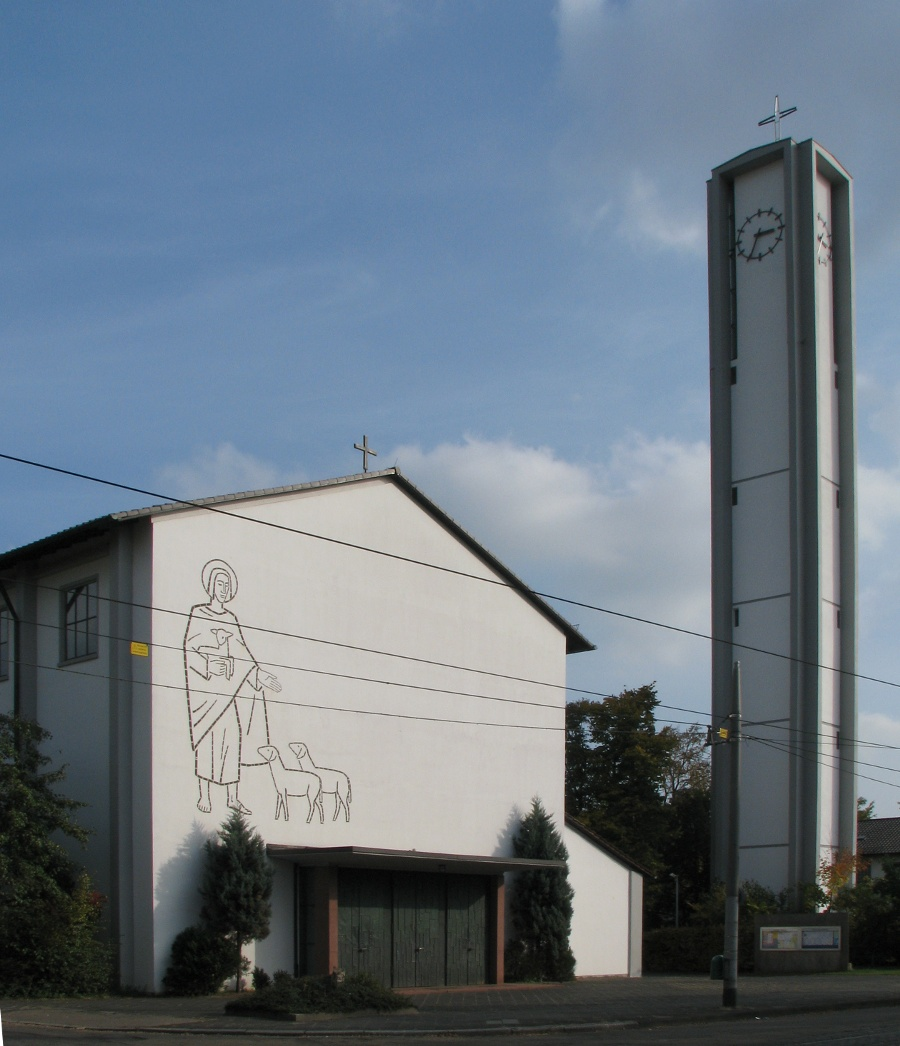
Gute-Hirten-Kirche

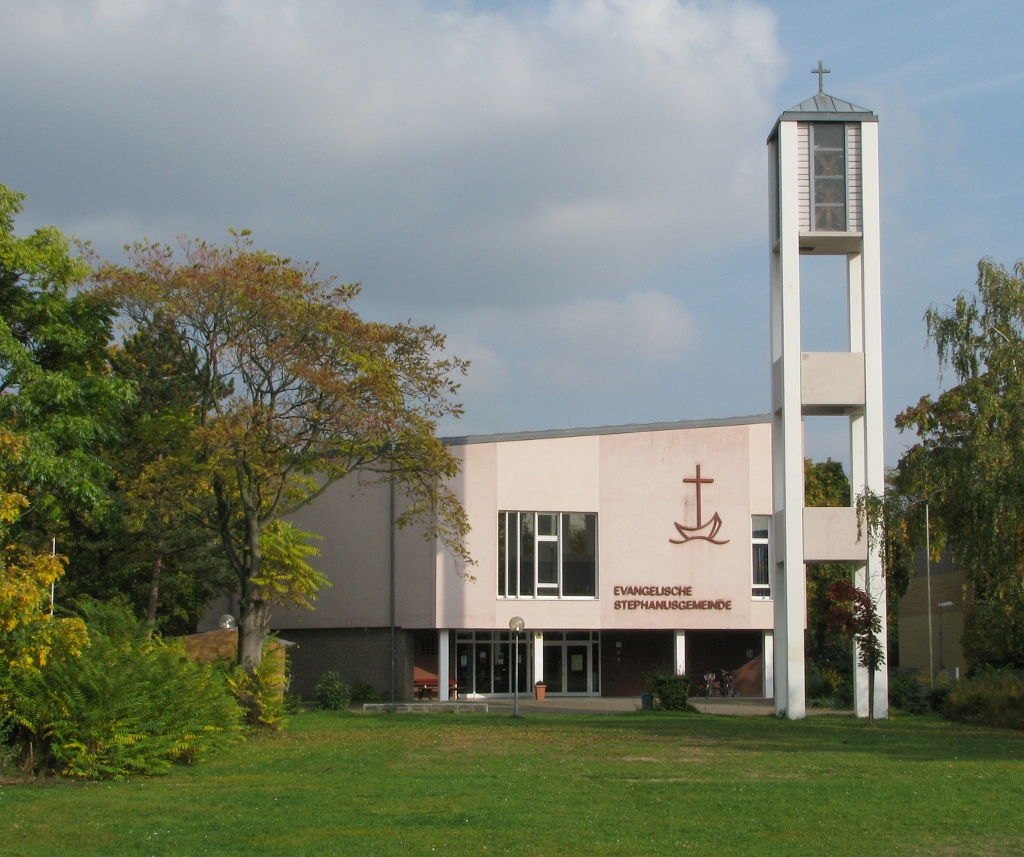
Stephanuszentrum

The Protestant Emmauskirche (Emmaus Church) dates from 1953. The Catholic Gute-Hirten-Kirche (Good Stepherd Church) was completed in 1959 with the steeple. The Protestant Stephanuszentrum (Stephanus Center) in Schönau-Nord from 1967 was expanded with a bell tower in 1993. East of the Riedbahn is the Käfertaler Wald, the largest forest in Mannheim and a popular local recreation area.

== Economy and infrastructure ==
At 7.8%, Schönau has the highest unemployment rate among all districts in Mannheim as of 2020. However, a lot of money is being invested in the district and it is developing rapidly.

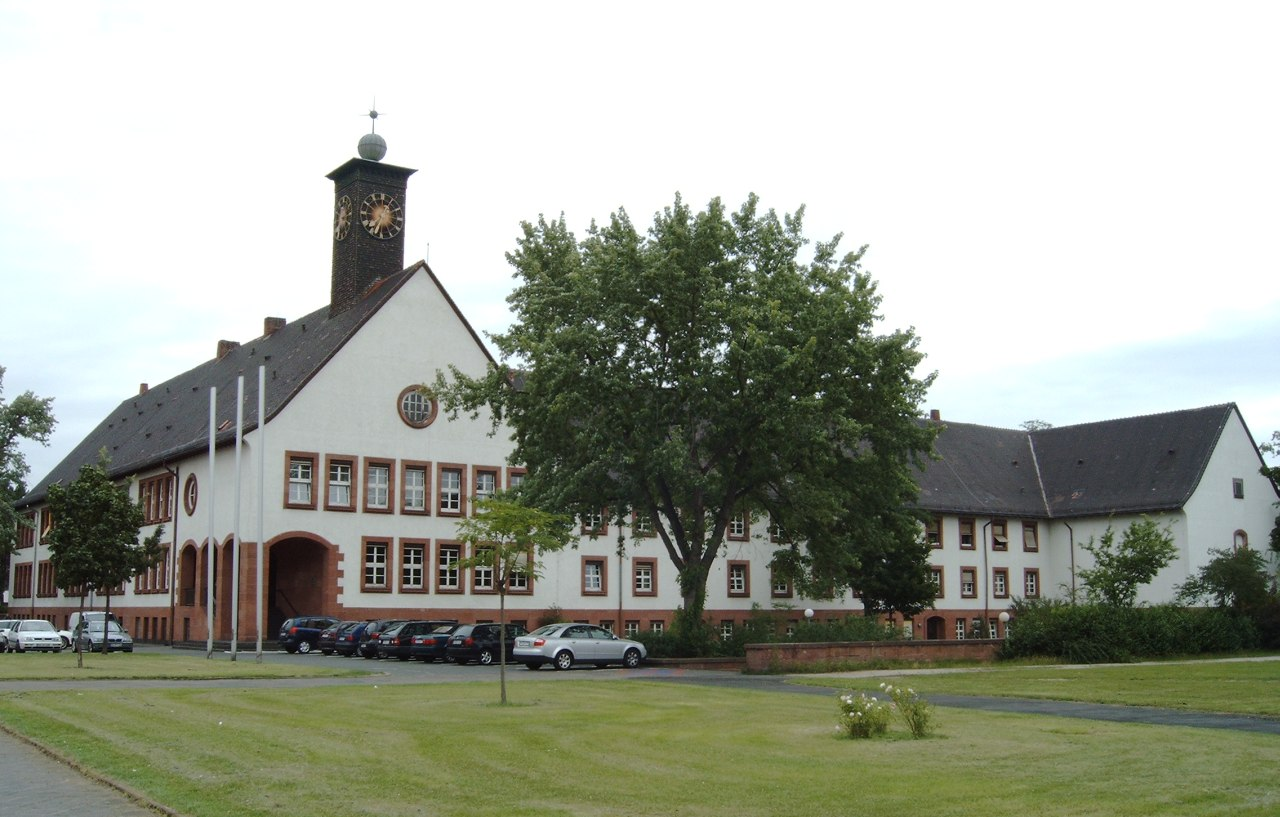
Schönauschule (Schönau School) from 1941

Schönau is equipped with a citizen service office of the city of Mannheim. There is a police post in the center of the district. The following educational institutions should be mentioned: Johanna-Geissmar-Gymnasium (named after the pediatrician; Gymnasium with the largest accessible area during school breaks in Mannheim), Schönauschule, Hans-Christian-Andersen-Ganztagesgrundschule and Kerschensteinerschule. The Johanna-Geissmar-Gymnasium also has a branch of the city library. On the western edge of Schönau, on Königsberger Allee, there is an industrial park in which Pepperl+Fuchs is the largest employer. The development can be roughly divided into three sections: housing developments in the south, a new development area in the north-east and blocks of flats with social housing in the north-west, about what RTL II made a documentation named Hartz und herzlich, which has led to a negative image of the district. According to German weekly news magazine Stern, "Die einzigen, die hier noch richtig Karriere machen, sind Drogendealer und Gangsterrapper" ("The only ones who still make a real career here are drug dealers and gangster rappers").

== Sports ==
Sports and association football in particular were and are indispensable in Mannheim. There is a local football club in the Schönau district. TSV 47 Mannheim-Schönau plays in the 2011/'12 season in the district class A.

== Notable people ==
- Helga Klein (15 August 1931 – 27 January 2021), German sprinter
- Uwe Rahn (born 21 May 1962), German association football player
- Norbert Hofmann (born 1 January 1972), German football player
- Sergio Peter (born 12 October 1986), German association football player

== Literature ==
- Alfred Heierling: Mannheim-Schönau: Von einer Randsiedlung zum Stadtteil. Mannheim 1999.
- Alfred Heierling: Chronik Mannheim-Schönau II. Mannheim 2008.
- Matthias Möller: Ein recht direktes Völkchen? Mannheim-Schönau und die Darstellung kollektiver Gewalt gegen Flüchtlinge. Frankfurt/Main 2007.
