= Berta Geissmar =

Secretary and business manager

- Born: 14 September 1892; Mannheim, Baden, German Empire
- Died: 3 November 1949 (aged 57); London, England
- Occupations: Secretary; Business manager

Berta Geissmar (14 September 1892 in Mannheim – 3 November 1949 in London) was the secretary and business manager for two prominent orchestral conductors, Wilhelm Furtwängler and Sir Thomas Beecham. From 1922 until 1935, Geissmar worked for the Berlin Philharmonic Orchestra and Furtwängler, including planning and organising foreign tours for the orchestra. Because of her Jewish heritage, she was forced to leave the post and her native Germany in late 1935. Fleeing to London, she gained a similar position with Thomas Beecham and the London Philharmonic Orchestra. She continued in this position until shortly before her death.

Geissmar's autobiography, The Baton and the Jackboot (1944) gives an account of the personalities of these two musicians, and provides a personal insight into the lives and persecution from 1933 of German people who, like her, were Jews or who opposed Nazi ideas.

== Life in Germany ==
=== Early life ===
Berta Geissmar was born and brought up in Mannheim. Her heritage was Jewish. Her father and grandfather were both prominent Mannheim citizens and had a law firm. The family was very musical, and Berta's father was one of the organisers and guarantors of a local society which presented concerts by leading soloists and chamber ensembles. He was a fine violinist and violist. From 1900 he performed on the Stradivarius previously played by Vieuxtemps (1820–1881). Berta later inherited this instrument.

Berta Geissmar studied Philosophy at Heidelberg University up to Ph.D. level, but her thesis was rejected by Rickert, the Dean of Philosophy, for being "too independent". He suggested that she revise it under his supervision, but she chose instead to re-present it at Frankfurt University, where it was accepted.

=== Wilhelm Furtwängler ===
Wilhelm Furtwängler was a family friend of the Geissmars. When Furtwängler was 15, Geissmar's quartet played through one of Furtwängler's early quartets. Later, in 1915, Furtwängler was appointed principal conductor of the Opera and Music Academy in Mannheim, and his friendship with the Geissmars was renewed.

Berta Geissmar described Furtwängler as a, "genius compounded of intellectual directness and an almost excessive shyness: whose timidity made him efface himself in any gathering, but who had such a great attraction for women that, if they did not fall victim to his musical genius, [they] were fascinated by his personality."

In 1921, Furtwängler was appointed director of the Staatskapelle Berlin. Berta Geissmar moved to Berlin to be his secretary and to work for the Artists’ League, which acted on an honorary basis for the protection of artists.

=== Berlin Philharmonic ===
In 1922, Furtwängler was appointed director of the Berlin Philharmonic Orchestra (BPO). To stabilise the orchestra's finances, Furtwängler began taking the BPO on foreign tours, bringing in revenue and putting the musicians on a full-time basis. Geissmar organised the first tour, and subsequently became the orchestra's official tour organiser. Geissmar also acted as Furtwängler's agent for his guest conducting engagements.

At this time, BPO concerts were organised by the agency Wolff and Sachs, who took 75% of the profits. Geissmar persuaded Louise Wolff to cede this monopoly, making a major contribution to the BPO's financial recovery.

Geissmar accompanied Furtwängler on his debut appearances with the New York Philharmonic in 1924. She also continued to plan several tours for the BPO., including Paris. In the winter of 1927 the BPO went to England for the first time, at Geissmar's suggestion. The orchestra subsequently visited every year, with increasing numbers of concerts until the events of the 1930s.

Geissmar was instrumental in Furtwängler's decision not to accept the directorship of the Vienna Opera, in spite of significant pressure for him to do so. She also accompanied him as his secretary to the 1931 Bayreuth Festival.

By 1932, following tours with the orchestra to the Netherlands, Belgium and England, the financial difficulties of the orchestra were almost overcome. The fiftieth anniversary of the orchestra was celebrated in this year.

=== The Third Reich ===
Geissmar's memoirs, written during the war, describe how Nazi ideology eroded the artistic ideals of German musicians. Without warning, in late March 1933 every newspaper carried on the front page a notice forbidding Jewish employees from working. As a Jew, Geissmar was directly affected. The Nazi Party directly tried to purge the orchestra of Jews but Furtwängler prevented this from happening; his high-profile made it difficult for the Nazis to enact their racial policy. However, they began to hold Geissmar to blame for bad publicity abroad because of her foreign contacts, and blamed their problems with Furtwängler on her "influence".

When in 1934 Furtwängler resigned all his state positions in protest at a ban on the composer Hindemith, all Jews, including Geissmar, were purged from the BPO. Geissmar retained her position as Furtwängler's assistant, but was subsequently forced to leave Berlin, her passport confiscated and forbidden from contacting Furtwängler.

=== Escaping the Nazis ===
Geissmar was isolated from her friends and work. In Berlin influential friends could not visit her without taking precautions not to be seen. After she left Berlin she spent most of her time in rural Bavaria. Meanwhile, Furtwängler appointed an “Aryan” secretary, but she struggled to keep his affairs in order. Several times Furtwangler and Geissmar met secretly and he told her about these problems, which she was not permitted to fix. She found that, when they were apart, the Nazis fed him with lies about what she was doing, in order to increase the pressure on him. Eventually she was granted permission to sort out Furtwängler's affairs while Furtwängler was travelling.

Of Furtwängler's eventual compromise with the Nazis, Geissmar says that it “represented a complete surrender of Furtwängler in the eyes of independent observers”. According to her, he was criticised for this surrender and his reputation never entirely recovered.

Geissmar resolved to get her passport back and find a job abroad. A friend introduced her to Anthony van Hoboken who had created a Photographic Archive of Musical Scores at the Austrian National Library and wished to expand it. He proposed that she visit libraries in the United States to arrange exchanges of material. In December 1935, thanks to a new application containing evidence of the Hoboken offer and an indirect contact with Goering she obtained her passport and left Germany immediately.

In the United States she worked on the library project, but it was delayed while still in the planning stage. Following the Anschluss, the Nazis took control of the Vienna Library and it was cancelled.

Thomas Beecham arrived in New York City to conduct the Philharmonic. Geissmar had known him since 1927 through her work with the BPO—he had also conducted the BPO, and had personally guaranteed one of their English tours after their English agent had become insolvent. He readily invited her to work for him in London during the Covent Garden Spring season.

== Beecham and London ==
Berta Geissmar arrived in London in April 1936 and Beecham appointed her as his permanent secretary. That also made her the secretary of the London Philharmonic Orchestra (LPO), founded by Beecham in 1932. Great care was taken to keep her new job secret during this time, as she was still expected to return to Germany by Nazi authorities. Eventually her emigration was confirmed.

Geissmar played a key part in organising European contributions to Covent Garden's celebrations of the forthcoming Coronation, working with Beecham, who had artistic control there.

She used her European contacts to plan tours abroad for the LPO, including to Germany in 1936. In concern for her safety, Beecham obtained reassurances from Ribbentrop who claimed that she would be "welcome". The tour was a success under the supervision of her former BPO colleagues.

At the outbreak of war in 1939, Covent Garden closed down. The LPO's financial arrangements collapsed. The musicians therefore reformed it as a co-operative, with a committee and with Geissmar still secretary. They kept going with Sunday concerts at the Queen's Hall and provincial tours.

In April 1940, Beecham left for Australia, where he had prior bookings. In 1941, the Queen's Hall, together with the LPO's instruments, was bombed out. They moved to the Royal Albert Hall and many instruments were offered to replace the lost ones.

Geissmar continued in her post until shortly before her death.

=== 1936 ===
When she arrived in London she met Beecham straight away. Now he asked her to join him permanently. He immediately agreed the salary she requested but she soon learned that he had doubled the figure – an example of his generosity to a person with few other options. She was still supposed to be in the U.S.A "travelling on business" and intending to return to Germany. A German lawyer specialising in such problems navigated her status through the Nazi minefield and make her free to leave Germany for good. Beecham arranged her British Work Permit. Her new position was kept secret until all the German paperwork was in her hands as the Nazis might have enjoyed frustrating it. A fee of £5,000 had to be paid to the Nazi government!

She played a key part in organising European contributions to Covent Garden's celebrations of the coronation of King Edward VIII planned for 12 May 1937. (In the event, Edward VIII abdicated and the same day was used to crown King George VI and Queen Elizabeth). She travelled extensively in Europe using the contacts she had gained for Furtwängler.

She realised that her new job was much easier than her old one. At the Berlin State Opera, decisions were endlessly debated by politicians, committees and artists before she could get on. At Covent Garden, Beecham was in charge. His artistic judgement was generally respected, as was Furtwängler's, but Beecham also had wit, charm, political nous and money. In Germany, where Furtwängler had had to resign because of political interference, Beecham's prestige was respected and the Nazis had no power to direct him. Typically, after some ideas had been considered for the Coronation Season, he said, "You had better go to Paris at once. You will discuss [a French opera] in general with M. Rouché [Director of the Paris Opéra]-and then you will proceed to Switzerland and meet Furtwängler. You will ask him to conduct the German season for me next year and I will give you a letter for him". By comparison with Berlin, this was "a pleasure cruise".

She organised the first tour of Germany by Beecham and London Philharmonic Orchestra. She was worried that the Nazis would make difficulties for her if she returned to Germany but Sir Thomas told her not to worry. Ribbentrop assured Beecham that she would be welcome and also that his appointees could organise everything in Germany. Although Geissmar was glad to receive Ribbentrop's assurances she was also angry that the Nazis had tormented her for a whole year but suddenly now that Beecham was her protector she was ‘welcome’. Her inquiries convinced her that Ribbentrop's men lacked the necessary experience so she placed the German work in the hands of the BPO who were delighted by the opportunity. Furtwängler too did everything he could to help.

Geissmar gives a detailed account of the actual tour: how her new position and domicile transformed her status, the formal Germanic ceremonies, the Nazi use of Beecham for Public Relations, the genuinely friendly relations between British and German musicians at a party for both orchestras, the anger in Leipzig at the overnight disappearance of Mendelssohn’s statue from outside the Gewandhaus, the scenic journeys alone with Beecham travelling by car between concerts and Beecham’s detailed knowledge of the places on the way.

=== 1937 ===
In 1937 she established herself on the top floor of 36 Red Lion Square. The house provided space for her furniture and other belongings from Germany, we well as playing chamber music. Most of the square, including her house and its contents, was destroyed in The Blitz, .

Beecham and the LPO performed in Paris to general acclaim. The Coronation produced many fine concerts, operas and parties. Furtwangler conducted two BPO concerts, one with Beethoven's Ninth Symphony, and two performances of the Ring. Toscanini conducted several concerts at the Queen's Hall. Bruno Walter conducted the Vienna Philharmonic. Geissmar visited Bayreuth to get recommendations for Beecham’s 1938 Wagner productions and used her tact to reconcile their opinions with those of Beecham. She visited Mannheim where most Jews of her generation had left. The old and sick remained, but they were to be killed or imprisoned in 1938.

For 1937-8, Beecham decided to cancel all his engagements outside Britain. Herbert Janssen suddenly arrived in London, having been given two hours notice to leave Germany, without any assets. Geissmar invited him to stay with her and Beecham engaged him for a concert. (Note: Other sources suggest that he left Germany in 1938 and went straight to Argentina].)

=== 1938 ===
Willem Mengelberg came at the beginning of the year to conduct the LPO. Beecham always said, “Let us do...”. He didn't claim authority but they recognised his ability and enjoyed working under its direction. Mengelberg just gave orders and long lectures. They were working on the Vorspiel and Liebestod from Tristan and Isolde and the orchestra didn't like being treated like children. Geissmar had known him since 1924. She took him aside and mentioned that the LPO had played this music before - under Beecham, Furtwängler and Bruno Walter, no less. This may have prevented a crisis.

Furtwängler and the BPO came for what turned out to be the last time before the War. She was troubled by Furtwängler's apparent toleration of the Nazi Regime and later wrote him a letter expressing her concerns.

Ribbentrop was recalled to Germany to become Foreign Minister and the Nazis took charge of Austria. Great Austrian institutions like the Vienna Philharmonic Orchestra, the Vienna State Opera and the Musikverein were stripped of those whose life's work had been to uphold the excellence of these institutions, to be replaced by placemen. Covent Garden was deluged by letters from top Viennese musicians trying to get work and they did their best. There was a production of Die Zauberflöte. The event of the season was Richard Strauss’s Elektra. Beecham excelled himself. Rose Pauly (as Elektra) declared that she had never sung the opera under such brilliant leadership. The first Czech crisis happened on May 21st. British opinion had changed and Hitler had to back down for the moment. Geissmar paid her last visit to Germany before the War. Her business transactions went well but there were many changes and compromises between art and Nazism and rumours of war. Geissmar had a visit from a pastor, a friend of Martin Niemöller, who had inspired her on 31 Dec 1934 when she was at a low ebb after leaving Furtwängler. He was in England briefly and could have stayed there with his family but was going back to his duty.

She had an unexpected encounter at a dinner party with Ernst Hanfstaengl. Early in the Nazi period Hanfstaengl had been Hitler’s Press chief and music advisor. One day, in the BPO office, she had taken a phoned order from him to cancel the pianist who had been engaged for a concert and replace him with Wilhelm Backhaus. It was said at the time that he was obsessed with her relationship with Furtwängler and had told Hitler that they had had children. Later he had had to flee Germany and was now living in England. He shook hands with pretended warmth but she got very angry because he was a principal cause of her troubles. Their hostess had to put them together in another room.

In September the Russian Ballet came and the LPO played for them. Beecham was in the country, not needed. Many people were coming from Austria and Czechoslovakia. Hitler threatened Beneš with war and everyone was very worried. As a "German" she worried that she would again be an outcast. Others worried about husbands and friends being called up. Kind friends at Covent Garden found reasons to visit and encourage her in her lonely office. The crisis approached – then on September 30 the Munich Agreement was signed.

Beecham returned in October and a short season of opera began, as though nothing had happened. Concerts and recitals began. Many people visited from Europe. Strengthened by their bloodless victory, the Nazis confiscated the passports of “non-Aryans”. Emigration passports would however be made available. The programmes for the 1938–9 Queen's Hall season were chosen. Beecham and the LPO made records which were very good. Beecham prepared a Sibelius Festival. He was so focussed on this that his normal courtesy deserted him. Sibelius was not well enough to attend but his daughter attended all the performances.

In January the customary visit by Furtwängler and the BPO was cancelled as a result of Kristallnacht the previous November. Geissmar's mother, though over seventy, decided that she must leave Germany but the formalities took nine months and she had to leave almost all her property behind.

Geissmar spent Christmas in Paris. She met Janssen. He had prospered in London and Paris. In the summer he was to go to Covent Garden, then Buenos Aires, then the Metropolitan Opera, New York.

=== 1939 ===
Felix Weingartner conducted his usual concerts. At 76 years he was still full vigour and charm and still got good work from the orchestra. Every day he took a walk when most people were still in bed. He had not been allowed to work in Nazi-Germany or Austria under Nazi rule despite his "good" ancestry and no reason had been given. Eventually he and his wife moved to Switzerland, where they were both citizens. They stayed in touch until his death in 1942.

Despite the looming clouds of war Beecham was determined to give his usual International Season. He had just arranged a visit of the German Opera from Prague when Hitler moved into there. The visit was cancelled. The President of France made a State visit and a gala was held in Covent Garden. Pablo Casals gave a concert in the Royal Albert Hall in aid of Spanish child victims of the war there. Ironically it was on the very day that the Republic surrendered (March 28). The International Season took place, with some compromises owing to the situation.

Geissmar took a short break in Paris, which was anti-German. She saw an excellent production of Berlioz’s huge opera Les Troyens. Beecham was hoping to put it on in London in 1940. Of course that didn't happen. Beecham agreed a visit to Australia. A visit to the US and Canada by the LPO was planned.

At the outbreak of war, Geissmar was in Dorset. Beecham asked her to return to London. She obtained Police permission, as a citizen of an enemy nation, to do so. Covent Garden ceased operations. She moved the office contents mostly to Boosey & Hawkes with a few things at her home. The LPO's calendar was mostly cancelled and its company suspended. To keep it going the musicians appointed a committee to run it as a cooperative. They gave concerts in the provinces and also in the Queen's Hall, conducted by Beecham.

=== 1940 ===
At the Queen's Hall concert on January 14, Beecham made an appeal for funds to keep the LPO going. The public responded handsomely and the publication of a bi-monthly bulletin, the London Philharmonic Post, began to keep supporters in touch. Beecham left for Australia in April, after a concert of Sibelius in aid of Finland. Later she was to meet him in the US. In 1943, as Geissmar finished her book, he had not yet returned to England.

Like many, Geissmar was deeply worried about the future but in particular, with talk about internment of German residents, whether she would be rejected by the British, as she had been by the Nazis. However her friends at the LPO reassured her and in the event few German women were interned.

The LPO reached a financial crisis but a few big donations, a national appeal and agreement by the musicians to switch to ad hoc pay got them started. Then Jack Hylton took them around Britain to give promenade concerts.

The Proms continued as usual with Sir Henry Wood conducting the London Symphony Orchestra at the Queen's Hall. Often an air raid started during the concert but people still stayed even though could mean staying all night until the All Clear. Food and drink were arranged and impromptu entertainment. The season was stopped prematurely on September 7 because of the raids.

Geissmar moved her mother from Red Lion Square to safer accommodation in Hampstead while she herself spent the night in public shelters until the time came to meet Beecham in the US, which would be soon. On September 24 the top of her house was bombed out. Her friends at the LPO were very supportive and she felt bonded to them as never before. Beecham sent a cable – he was extending his time in Australia and she should stay in England. So she joined her mother in Hampstead. There were raids even there – her few remaining possessions got a soaking and another house in the road was destroyed. Beecham's two sons, Adrian and Thomas, invited her from time-to-time to one or other of their country homes for respite.

In November the blitz died down. The LPO Sunday concerts were resumed. Concerts were organised in the National Gallery by Myra Hess. The LPO expanded its touring. Richard Tauber, now a British citizen, offered the LPO a concert, for their benefit, with him conducting and singing. Despite initial concerns, it went well. Tauber took them on provincial tours.

=== 1941 ===
On the night of Saturday May 10, there was a big raid. The House of Commons and the Queen's Hall were destroyed and Westminster Abbey was seriously damaged. At Queen's Hall many instruments were lost as they had just given a concert and on Sunday there was to be another concert. They moved the concert to the Duke's Hall of the Royal Academy of Music. At the Queen's Hall site they set up a box office. They borrowed more instruments and went ahead regardless.

The concerts, including Proms, were moved to the Royal Albert Hall. The BBC broadcast an appeal for instruments and they were deluged with offers. An emergency staff of helpers was recruited to deal with letters and phone calls.

Geissmar's house was hit for the third time in the May 10 raid. This time her furniture, now in the basement, was destroyed. The same night, Boosey and Hawkes’ premises were damaged for the second time. Luckily Beecham's precious library survived and was retrieved from the ruins.

=== 1942 onwards ===
The blitz came to an end. Concerts continued. Émigrés put on music from their own countries. In October the LPO celebrated its tenth birthday, receiving congratulations from all over the world. Geissmar expresses her gratitude that she lives in a country “free in spirit”. She laments that Germany has lost this freedom and now has only “an empty façade of dictatorial splendour”. She gives an example. She and her mother were sitting in the box of Sir Malcolm Sargent before the Royal Choral Society Christmas 1942 concert. Sir Malcolm (who was conducting) had sent her the tickets. Suddenly Mrs Churchill and her daughter came in. Obviously the Geissmars yielded their seats at the front but Mrs Churchill tried to stop them from doing so. In Nazi Germany this was inconceivable. The equivalent ladies would have been surrounded by flunkies and any other occupants chucked out.

Geissmar's obituary in the Times is confusing at this point. The staff reporter says that she retired in 1944 but Thomas Russell, who was a member of the LPO committee says that she devoted the last ten years of her life to the orchestra until her final illness.

== Family ==
Many of her family members became victims of the Shoah. Among them her uncle Friedrich, who committed suicide shortly before deportation in 1940, and her aunt Johanna Geissmar, who was gassed in Auschwitz in 1942. Both were physicians. Another uncle, judge Jakob Geissmar, died in 1943 in Theresienstadt concentration camp. His wife Elisabeth née Hirsch and his daughter Elsa were both murdered by the Nazi regime in 1944 in Auschwitz.
