= Käfertal (Mannheim) =

District in Mannheim, Baden-Württemberg, Germany

- Borough of Mannheim
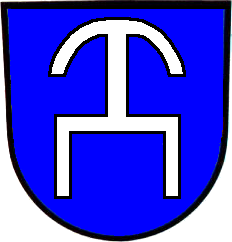
- Coat of arms
- Interactive map of Käfertal
- Location within Germany Location within Baden-Württemberg
- Coordinates: 49°31′N 8°31′E
- Country: Germany
- State: Baden-Württemberg
- Admin. region: Karlsruhe
- District: Urban district
- City: Mannheim

Area
  - Total: 10.73 km^{2} (4.14 sq mi)

Population (2019-12-31)
  - Total: 26,446
  - Density: 2,465/km^{2} (6,383/sq mi)
- Time zone: UTC+01:00 (CET)
  - Summer (DST): UTC+02:00 (CEST)
- Postal codes: 68309
- Website: Käfertal-Portal

Käfertal is a borough (Stadtbezirk) of Mannheim, Baden-Württemberg, Germany in the Rhine-Neckar metropolitan region which is divided into the quarters Käfertal-Mitte, Speckweggebiet, Käfertal-Süd, Sonnenschein and Franklin. It has a population of 26,446 people as of December 31, 2019.

== Geography ==
Käfertal is located in the northeast of Mannheim. The neighboring districts are Vogelstang, Feudenheim, Wohlgelegen, and Waldhof. In the northeast is the city of Viernheim (Bergstraße district).

== Gallery ==
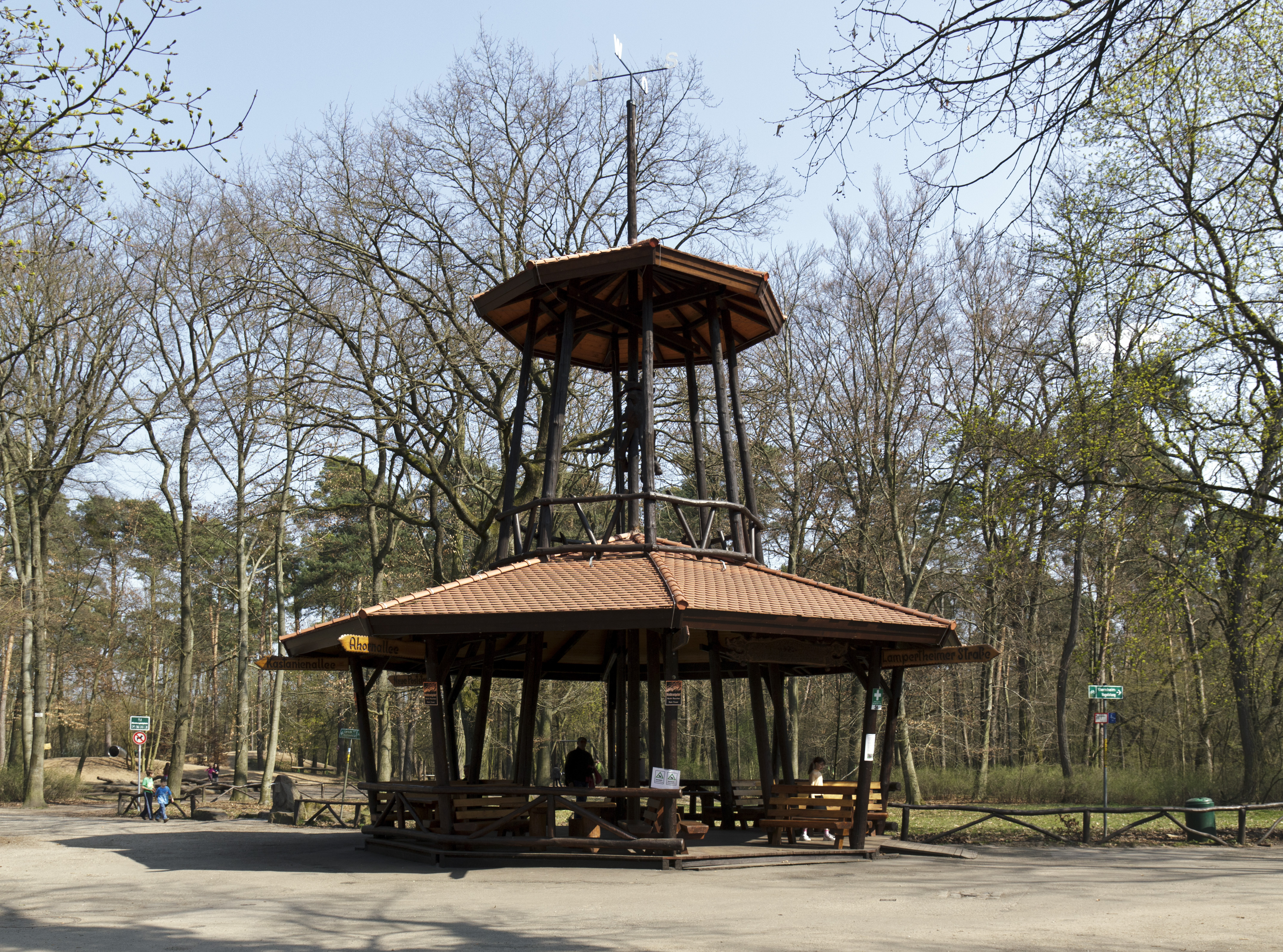
Karlsternpavillon in the Käfertaler Wald

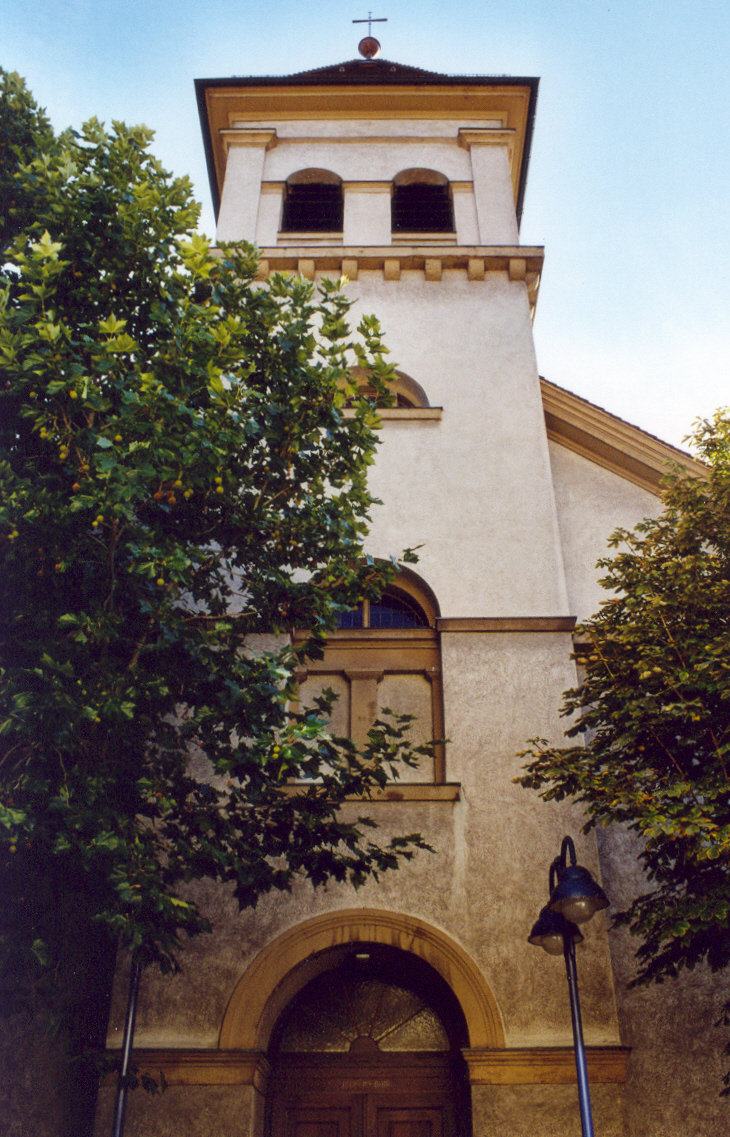
Laurentiuskirche

== Literature ==
- Lorenz Klingert: Festbuch zur Siebenjahrhundert-Feier der ehemaligen Gemeinde Käfertal 1227–1927. Mannheim 1927.
- Günter Bertschmann: Käfertal: 750 Jahre Käfertal 1227–1977. Mannheim 1977.
