= Sandhofen =

- Borough of Mannheim
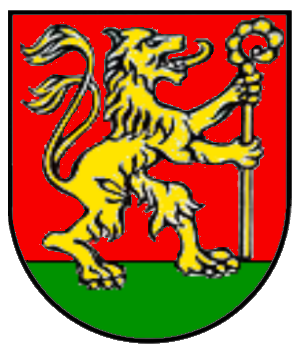
- Coat of arms
- Interactive map of Sandhofen
- Location within Germany Location within Baden-Württemberg
- Coordinates: 49°33′N 8°27′E
- Country: Germany
- State: Baden-Württemberg
- Admin. region: Karlsruhe
- District: Urban district
- City: Mannheim

Area
  - Total: 26.71 km^{2} (10.31 sq mi)

Population (2019-12-31)
  - Total: 13,853
  - Density: 518.6/km^{2} (1,343/sq mi)
- Time zone: UTC+01:00 (CET)
  - Summer (DST): UTC+02:00 (CEST)
- Postal codes: 68307
- Website: Official website

Sandhofen is a northern borough (Stadtbezirk) of Mannheim, Baden-Württemberg, Germany. The US Army is present in Sandhofen with Coleman Airfield and Coleman Barracks. The US Army's only military prison in Europe was located at Coleman. All US Army helicopter maintenance for Europe and the Middle East was once performed at Coleman. Coleman is currently used for storage and maintenance of military vehicles.
