= List of killings by law enforcement officers in post-reunification Germany (1990s) =

Listed below are people killed by non-military law enforcement officers in Germany after reunification in the 1990s whether or not in the line of duty, irrespective of reason or method. Included, too, are cases where individuals died in police custody due to applied techniques. Inclusion in the list implies neither wrongdoing nor justification on the part of the person killed or the officer involved. The listing simply documents occurrences of deaths and is not complete.

== Statistics ==
| Year | Number killed by use of firearms (official statistics) | Number killed by any means (counted) | Number of shots fired on persons |
|---|---|---|---|
| 1990 | 7 (post-reunification) | | 76 (57 in old states, 19 in Mecklenburg-Vorpommern, Sachsen and Thüringen only; full year) |
| 1991 | 9 | | 136 |
| 1992 | 12 | | 150 |
| 1993 | 16 | | 123 |
| 1994 | 11 (including Halim Dener) | | 118 |
| 1995 | 21 | | 137 |
| 1996 | 11 | | 95 |
| 1997 | 13 | | 68 |
| 1998 | 8 | | 70 |
| 1999 | 19 | | 61 |
| Total | 127 | | 1034 |

== 1990 (October-December) ==
| Date (YYYY-MM-DD) | Name | Age | Place | State | Summary of events |
|---|---|---|---|---|---|
| 1990-10-11 | N.N. | 35 | Bremen | Bremen | A Spanish national from Hannover stole 16.000 DM in a bank robbery and was apprehended by a SEK squad in Hemelingen shortly after. When the robber pulled out a gas pistol, two officers fired four warning shots before shooting the man four times in the right side of the foot, wrist and hip, killing him by a double piercing lungshot. |
| 1990-10-26 | N.N. | 34 | Erding | Bayern | While a plainclothed narcotics agent arrested two Turkish drug dealers in a sting operation, another suspected associate attempted to escape by car. A 41-year-old investigator fatally shot the man in the back of the head as he drove away, crashing into a tree as a result. In a confusing twist, it was found that the man was actually an undercover police investigator and was using a civilian police car. It is assumed that the dead officer didn't want to be recognized as police. |
| 1990-11-03 | Polley, Mike | 18 | Leipzig | Sachsen | During riots between two rival football hooligan groups and the police after a FC Sachsen-Dynamo Berlin match, one person was shot by the police. A group of football fans, armed with makeshift bluntweapons, had surrounded police officers at Leipzig-Leutzsch station. After several warning shots, officers fired into the crowd 57 times. A Dynamo Berlin fan was fatally struck from a distance of 40 meters and four other people were injured. The exact circumstances and whether the use of a firearm was justified are unclear. |
| 1990-11-07 | S., Thomas | 26 | München | Bayern | Two police officers attempted to arrest a man who was in the process of entering a car reported as stolen at Viktualienmarkt. As he started the engine, the man pulled out a gas pistol, leading an officer to shoot the motorist twice in the back of the head. It was found that he had a warrant for fraud and car theft. |
| 1990-11-11 | Strauber, Gerd-Jürgen | 45 | Bad Camberg | Hessen | A man from Grävenwiesbach fled from police as they were about to conduct a routine check and opened fire on pursuing officers. A female police officer in her car was heavily injured with two gunshots. The man then hid in shrubbery and fired six shots at a second patrol, who then fatally shot him. The man's car was found shortly after, which was found to contain the body of his ex-wife whom he had murdered the same day in Usingen, having also attempted to kill her new boyfriend later on. The man had used an illegally modified gas pistol in all three shootings. |
| 1990-12-03 | N.N. | 21 | Seevetal | Niedersachsen | Two burglars fled the site of an attempted home invasion in Hittfeld. A 31-year-old officer caught up to the suspects and fired a warning shot. The men held the officer in a chokehold, attempting to grab his sidearm, during which the officer had his nose broken and was stabbed 13 times with a screwdriver. When the men let go and continued their flight, the officer opened fire on them, killing one of the burglars, a Yugoslavian national. |
| 1990-12-19 | D., Petrisor | 21 | Berlin | Berlin | Two Kripo officers were called to a refugee accommodation in Schmargendorf after a Romanian resident reported that he and two friends were robbed by six countrymen. Three of the robbers had beaten the victims with a pistol, sprayed them with tear gas and kicked them before fleeing with 50 DM. An hour later, the officers located a car with two Romanian men inside. During a routine ID check, one of the occupants shot 36-year-old officer Dietrich F. in the face with a gas pistol at point blank range, sustaining heavy eye and ear injuries before falling unconscious. His colleague, 35-year-old Frank L., believed F. was killed and when the attacker fled on foot, Frank L. fired a warning shot to no effect. Three more gunshots were fired by L., reportedly aimed at the legs of the suspect, who was fatally struck in the back. While it was found that the other man was a resident of the refugee accommodation, neither he or the deceased could be tied to the robbery. |

== 1991 ==
| Date (YYYY-MM-DD) | Name | Age | Place | State | Summary of events |
|---|---|---|---|---|---|
| 1991-01-01 | N.N. | 19 | Remseck | Baden-Württemberg | An American teenager with psychological issues heavily wounded both his parents in a sword attack at their home in the U.S. settlement of Pattonville. Police unsuccessfully used tear gas, then shot the attacker when he charged at the officers while wielding two daggers, dying at the scene from his wounds. He had been undergoing psychiatric care. |
| 1991-01-23 | N.N. | 20 | Sailauf | Bayern | Police were called that a man had locked himself in his room with a gun and threatened to shoot anyone who entered. Officers fired two fatal shots in self-defense when he rushed out towards police. The weapon was found to be a gas pistol. |
| 1991-06-21 | N.N. | 25 | Leipzig | Sachsen | Officers arrested three members of a neo-Nazi skinhead gang during a traffic stop, as their car had been linked to a xenophobic attack that injured four gamblers. It was believed that the skinheads were on their way to another attack. An accidental weapon discharge occurred during the arrest, fatally wounding a man on the passenger seat. An assortment of blunt weapons was found in the trunk. An investigation into the shooting was ultimately halted. |
| 1991-06-24 | N.N. | 37 | Salzgitter | Niedersachsen | A police commissioner who was being forced into early retirement due to mental instability killed his son-in-law with a knife. The commissioner then threatened to kill his 18 month old grandson, leading to arriving police to make use of a "final shot" on the offender after a shot in the leg proved ineffective. |
| 1991-06-24 | N.N. | 50 | Salzgitter | Niedersachsen | A police commissioner who was being forced into early retirement due to mental instability killed his son-in-law with a knife. The commissioner then threatened to kill his 18 month old grandson, leading to arriving police to make use of a "final shot" on the offender after a shot in the leg proved ineffective. |
| 1991-09-05 | Henrich, Herbert | 38 | Kassel | Hessen | A convict escaped during a morning doctor's officer visit after he took judicial officers at gunpoint and fled in a car with the physician as a hostage. After releasing the doctor, the convict used another car, then stole a taxi. He took a police officer hostage during a traffic stop and forced the officer to drive him to Kassel-Mitte, where he again fled alone. A female passerby recognized him in an inn in the evening, allowing police to secure the officer from the taxi's trunk. Two officers shot and killed the convict when he pulled out his gun during an attempted arrest. It was never determined who provided the convict with the gun and his two getaway vehicles. |
| 1991-10-24 | N.N. | 20 | Samtens | Mecklenburg-Vorpommern | A police patrol attempted to conduct a search on three youths sleeping inside at the bar of a night club. One of the men, a security guard, pulled out a gas pistol from under a pillow, leading to a physical struggle between the officers and the suspect, who fired several stray shots. The man ended up being shot by an officer, dying at the scene. |
| 1991-11-05 | N.N. | 22 | Frankfurt am Main | Hessen | A joint task force of Würzburg and Frankfurt police had followed a known heroin user to a drug deal with three Yugoslavian drug dealers during a sting operation. As the narcotics agents arrested the buyer and his wife, the regular officers went to arrest the drug dealers, who tried to flee in their car. The group rammed a police car and when the driver suddenly opened the door, a police officer fatally shot him in the head. None of the suspects were armed. |
| 1991-11-09 | Henschel, Roland | 30 | Lüdenscheid | Nordrhein-Westfalen | A bank robber was shot in the head by SEK as he was attempting to pull back into the building with a hostage after inspecting a getaway vehicle provided by police. The robber, who was out of prison on furlough while serving a sentence for a 1988 terroristic blackmail threat against Deutsche Bundesbahn, had held 20 people hostage for 21 hours and demanded ten million DM through a bank employee. The shooting was deemed justified by invoking a "fatal shot". |
| 1991-12-19 | N.N. | 50-60 | Essen | Nordrhein-Westfalen | A robber who had stolen money from a bank courier was caught by police after a one-hour manhunt. As he was being arrested, the robber produced a hand grenade and was subsequently shot; the grenade did not detonate. |

== 1992 ==
| Date (YYYY-MM-DD) | Name | Age | Place | State | Summary of events |
|---|---|---|---|---|---|
| 1992-01-19 | Sund, Peter | 24 | Bernburg | Sachsen-Anhalt | Two police officers were called to a break-in at a sales outlet. The unarmed burglar made insulting remarks as the police attempted to catch him and as he was being arrested, the burglar resisted and kicked at the air. Due to this, one officer who had been keeping his hand on his sidearm, allegedly lost his balance and stumbled over, inadvertently pulling the trigger on his holstered Makarov, shooting the burglar in the head. He was tried, but found not guilty on 23 November 1993. |
| 1992-02-23 | N.N. | | Stralsund | Mecklenburg-Vorpommern | Two convicts escaped from a clinic through violent means. Both were caught shortly after, but one of the convicts was shot during the arrest. |
| 1992-04-10 | N.N. | 25 | Kelsterbach | Hessen | A burglar was killed by a ricocheting warning shot fired by police. There were conflicting accounts on whether the killed burglar and his 29-year-old accomplice had engaged the officers in a shootout beforehand. |
| 1992-04-24 | N.N. | 59 | Bonn | Nordrhein-Westfalen | A man suffering from health issues related to his alcoholism threatened other patients at a hospital in Medinghoven with a gun. He was killed when he fired on the arriving SEK officers, who found that his weapon had been a gas pistol. |
| 1992-06-03 | Mohamed, Osama | 22 | Hamburg | Hamburg | A bus driver called police because an Egyptian man was breaking the vehicle's interior with a crutch in Rahlstedt, after the driver, who was parked at a terminus station, had refused to drive him home in exchange for 50 DM. After police arrival, the man fought with a 32-year-old officer, hitting him with the crutch and biting him. As both men hit the ground, the attacker managed to grab the officer's gun and shot at him, hitting the asphalt and injuring the officer's face with shrapnel. The man then ran for the police car and grabbed another pistol from inside, pointing it at the downed officer and the officer's partner. The policewoman fired several shots at the offender, three shots striking and killing him on the spot. |
| 1992-07-29 | N.N. | | Finsterwalde | Brandenburg | Police fatally shot a man in the chest after he had injured his wife with a gas pistol. |
| 1992-07-31 | N.N. | 26 | Frankfurt am Main | Hessen | A burglar tried to escape pursuing police in Nordend-West by climbing a rain gutter and was shot during his attempt by an officer posted in the courtyard below. It was first believed that the burglar had died by an accidental fall. An investigation was launched, and the sentenced to a fine of 8.000 DM in February 1996. |
| 1992-08-03 | N.N. | 52 | Düren | Nordrhein-Westfalen | Police were called to the site of a noise complaint. The man responsible for the noise suddenly lunged at the officers with two knives. Two of them fled forcing the remaining 26-year-old officer to use deadly force. |
| 1992-10-16 | W., Johann | c.35 | Körperich | Nordrhein-Westfalen | Police anticipated a planned robbery by a trio of bank robbers who had already committed thirteen prior robberies in NRW and the Eifel region, stealing 1,7 million DM. A SEK unit received the robbers at the bank and were immediately threatened with revolvers and hand grenades. SEK ended up firing on and killing one of the robbers. A second robber was hit in the leg by a ricochet while the getaway driver was caught by Luxembourg police. It's suspected that the men spent the loot on real estate in eastern Germany and the Benelux region, although the surviving robbers refused to confirm this. |
| 1992-10-17 | N.N. | 67 | Kamen | Nordrhein-Westfalen | Two police officers were called to act as intermediaries in a dispute over rent between a tenant and landlord, after the latter had turned off electricity and heating despite receiving payment in forfeited property. During the talk, the landlord suddenly produced a gun and shot the officers, one in the abdomen and the other in the thigh, heavily wounding both. The latter officer then shot the attacker in the head. |
| 1992-10-22 | N.N. | 19 | Böblingen | Baden-Württemberg | A man raped and robbed a prostitute in Stuttgart, then attempted to commit another two rapes. A manhunt tracked the rapist to A8 after identifying his car with a fake French licence plate. During the pursuit, he intentionally rammed several vehicles. When police attempted to arrest him at a highway exit, he rammed a police car and was shot in return. A news report indicates that the officer who fired the killings shots was 22 years old and sentenced to 16 months probation on 21 August 1998 for manslaughter. |
| 1992-12-XX | Walz, Klaus | 50 | München | Bayern | Klaus Walz, alias Rainer Walldorf, a teacher and car dealer from Ettlingen who had a short-lived career in Formula 1 Larrousse, was wanted for false imprisonment of a French police officer and four counts of murder in France and Italy in connection to his alleged leadership of a Desio-based car smuggling ring. Walz was shot during a gunbattle with Munich police after they surrounded the hotel he was in. Some sources list his place of death as Monaco, as Munich is called Monaco (di Baviera) in Italian, which most of the reports about the case is written in. |

== 1993 ==
| Date (YYYY-MM-DD) | Name | Age | Place | State | Summary of events |
|---|---|---|---|---|---|
| 1993-01-21 | Schröder, Andreas | 26 | Bitterfeld | Sachsen-Anhalt | Police received report of a burglary happening at a fashion store. Upon their arrival, the three perpetrators ran from the plainclothed officers, who fired on them, hitting one of the burglars in the back. A trial was scheduled in relation to the death. |
| 1993-01-22 | Radu, Lorin | 21 | Staßfurt | Sachsen-Anhalt | A Romanian man arrested on suspicion of theft and lacking residency papers attempted to flee the police station as he was being escorted to a toilet. The 53-year-old officer accompanying him shot the man twice in the back in the courtyard. The officer was fined 13.500 DM. |
| 1993-02-10 | Peischel, Martin | 22 | Wolfratshausen | Bayern | Police were called about a "loudly driving" car without a licence plate. Police tailed the vehicle for one kilometer and approached the car for a search at a gas station. Noticing the officers, the motorist started the car to drive off. Without issuing commands, an officer ran alongside the moving vehicle and broke the window on the driver's side with his sidearm, causing an unintentional discharge that killed the driver. The passenger of the car, the deceased's brother, claimed that the car had not been registered yet, but that the licence was displayed in the rear window. The shooting caused discussion about the Bavarian standard issue Heckler & Koch P7 and whether its trigger was too sensitive. |
| 1993-02-19 | N.N. | 40 | Bad Salzungen | Thüringen | After a motorist knowingly drove away from a gas station in Eisenach without paying 37 DM for his fuel, police set up a road stop, which the motorist broke through with his car. An officer shot at the fleeing car, fatally hitting the motorist in the back of the head. |
| 1993-03-06 | Schiegnitz, Carl | 4 | Berlin | Berlin | A police van was responding to reports of a stabbing at Brandenburg Gate, which turned out to be a false alarm. On Schlossbrücke, the van skidded off the road on loose chippings after overtaking another car and impacted with five pedestrians (four members of a Marzahn family of six and a 41-year-old Lichtenberg man). The crash killed two children and heavily injured three adults, crippling one while another had been knocked into the Spree below; the couple's surviving children, aged 9 and 11, called medical assistance. The driver, 30-year-old officer Mike W., was flung through the windshield into a phone booth and heavily injured, while his passenger, 27-year old officer Hans F., suffered light injuries. W., who drove an excess speed of 70 km/h, claimed no memory of the incident and was found guilty of negligent homicide in December 1993, receiving seven months probation. F., who was not charged, was ordered to undergo psychiatric evaluation for a 30 July 2003 incident, where he held his empty sidearm to the head of a motorist and a policewoman, both times pulling the trigger. |
| 1993-03-06 | Schiegnitz, Rosa | 6 | Berlin | Berlin | |
| 1993-03-11 | Mangaoğlu, Ali | 41 | Hamburg | Hamburg | A diplomat with the Turkish consulate's attaché for Social and Religious Affairs was in St. Georg to visit Muslim locals for Ramadan when he got into an argument with a drunk man, 24-year-old Thorsten Jarling. A witness stated that the diplomat punched and kicked his opponent before shooting him twice with a .38 caliber revolver; Turkish diplomats in Germany were all required to carry firearms due to concerns over possible attacks by German-based members of the PKK. Two plainclothed policemen arrived at the scene after hearing the shots and found the diplomat kneeling over the other man. Upon noticing the officers, the diplomat pointed his gun at them, which prompted 26-year-old officer Peter Meyer to shoot the diplomat once in the chest, mortally wounding him. When the diplomat raised the gun again, the other officer fired two warning shots, rousing the other shot man, who stood up, stumbled two steps and collapsed dead just off the side walk. The diplomat died at a hospital from his injuries. The shooting led to outrage in Turkey, with news outlets comparing it to the murder of Mehmet Kaymakçı and the murder of Ramazan Avcı by Hamburg neo-Nazi gangs in 1985. Investigators initially suspected that the cause for the initial shooting had been a mugging and the diplomat had shot in self-defense, but also considered a possible drug deal gone wrong, as employees of the Turkish consulate were long suspected of narcotics trafficking under guidance of the MİT. The diplomat's family criticised police action, accusing them of misconduct, and in December 2023, his son publicly asked for witnesses to the shooting to come forwards with statements countering the official narrative. |
| 1993-04-20 | Wagner, Peter | 32 | Mannheim | Baden-Württemberg | The arrest of two suspected arms dealers in Jungbusch resulted in a scuffle, during which an officer's sidearm went off. The round passed through a suspect's arm and fatally struck another officer through the shoulder opening of his bulletproof vest. |
| 1993-05-31 | N.N. | 38 | Klausdorf | Schleswig-Holstein | During the chase of a suspect, the officer accidentally fired his weapon, striking and killing the suspect. |
| 1993-06-14 | G., Walter | 46 | München | Bayern | Two and a half months into a police observation of two known repeat criminals, officers inform SEK of the suspects and another accomplice breaking into a building in Allach. As they moved in for an arrest, SEK officers believed they heard gunshots and shot back at the burglars, who were wielding gas pistols, killing one. The 41-year-old partner-in-crime was heavily injured. The three burglars were suspected of having robbed several other places during the observation period. |
| 1993-06-30 | Romano, Andreas | 26 | Schönenberg-Kübelberg | Rheinland-Pfalz | Two police officers attempted to apprehend a Rom man wanted for attempted murder of a police officer during a burglary in January 1992 in Brandenburg an der Havel. After not reacting to a warning shot, the officers fired three times, one round hitting the man in the pelvis as he fled over a fence. The officers received death threats from the deceased's family afterwards and were put under personal protection as a result. |
| 1993-08-19 | Dittrich, Klaus-Heinz | 32 | Marienwerder | Brandenburg | A convicted rapist had escaped Justizvollzugsanstalt Spremberg during furlough in April. During his hiding, the convict raped a 15-year-old girl and ended up stealing a travel bus in Hamburg when he was found by the authorities. Upon being spotted in Groß Schönebeck, two police cruisers engaged the bus in a car chase, injuring an officer by ramming into his vehicle. After being surrounded on a bridge, the convict jumped into the Oder-Havel Canal to escape. Two officers fired three times, one shot striking the convict in the head, causing his death by drowning. The officers were cleared of all charges by appeal of the public prosecution that same year. |
| 1993-10-09 | N.N. | 39 | Hamm | Nordrhein-Westfalen | SEK responded to a report by a resident complaining about a mentally ill man in early retirement making excessive noise in his next-door apartment. Upon forcing entry, the man non-fatally stabbed one of the officers in the neck with a knife before being shot in the chest. It's suspected that he was distraught over a breakup with his girlfriend while a medical examination showed that he had a large cut to his throat from a suicide attempt just before police arrival. |
| 1993-10-19 | Korcz, Robert | 27 | Hamburg | Hamburg | A Polish national occupied the Polish general consulate in Steilshoop to protest a conviction made by a court against him, claiming it showed Poland's "lack of democracy". As it was 2:30 in the morning, the building was mostly empty and fully evacuated shortly after he entered, but SEK were called as he was threatening to detonate a WWII-era grenade. SEK attempted to negotiate with the intoxicated man for nearly 15 hours and attempted to incapacitate him by siccing a police dog through a window while he was drinking more alcohol. The dog was injured by glass shards during entry, with its yelps alerting the man who reached for his grenade, causing the officers to fire five shots, one striking him through the hand and fatally hitting his heart. The deceased had been previously imprisoned at Rawicz prison for desertion of his SZ RP unit and staged at least two interrupted lock-on protests in 1988 and 1989 by chaining himself to a pylon for several days to raise awareness against prisoner abuse he experienced. After the abolition of the communist government, he continued to accuse the new administration of violating his freedoms. |
| 1993-11-16 | N.N. | 34 | Kempten | Bayern | A varnish painter was having his personal information recorded in his apartment for an assault he committed, after he punched a bank teller for refusing to pay out his account. The man became belligerent and suddenly pulled out a dagger to stab the officer, who shot the varnisher twice in the chest with his service weapon. |
| 1993-11-19 | N.N. | 28 | Teisendorf | Bayern | A road block near Neukirchen was set to stop a man who had been driving into oncoming traffic on A8. The motorist had led police on a 40 km chase after he drove past a traffic checkpoint in Hallein in Austria, having nearly run over a gendarmerie officer in Salzburg. During his attempt, he was about to ram a police officer, but the officer's colleague fired five shots at the driver, fatally injuring him. Medication found in the car indicated that the deceased was mentally ill. |
| 1993-12-03 | S., Enis | 26 | Hamburg | Hamburg | Two robbers held up a post office in St. Georg, receiving 8,000 DM at gunpoint. A silent alarm had been triggered and police confronted the robbers as they fled through a back entrance. When one of the robbers threatened officers with a gun, they shot him three times. The accomplice was arrested without incident. |

== 1994 ==
| Date (YYYY-MM-DD) | Name | Age | Place | State | Summary of events |
|---|---|---|---|---|---|
| 1994-02-02 | N.N. | | Wolfhagen | Hessen | An 18-year-old police recruit shot his father in his sleep with his service weapon. |
| 1994-02-25 | P., Christian | 18 | Wulkow | Brandenburg | Police were called about a suspicious car in a forest. Officers identified the car as having been listed as stolen while the seven men at the scene, all Romanian nationals, were suspected of being a gang of burglars who had broken into several post offices in the past months. Three suspects were immediately arrested and during an attempted search on the three occupants of the car, the remaining suspects drove away. After a warning shot, two officers fired five times at the car, two gunshots striking one of the passengers. The suspects were arrested at a crossing, just after they had thrown the mortally wounded man out of the vehicle. The officers received ten and seven months probation. |
| 1994-03-10 | N.N. | 38 | Weiden | Bayern | During the arrest of two suspected drug dealers in a sting operation, a 24-year-old female officer accidentally shot one of the dealers' associates in his car, who died from his injuries at a hospital. The associate was found to be an undercover police officer, who had been clearly identified as one throughout the operation. The crime scene was immediately cleaned with a broom by other officers, who did not attend to the mortally wounded man, with a neighbouring resident performing first aid before arrival of an ambulance. |
| 1994-03-16 | N.N. | 22 | Bad Endorf | Bayern | Police pursued a car that avoided a traffic stop and accelerated from officers. The vehicle crashed against a wall and during the attempted arrest of the driver, a Kosovar sylum seeker with warrants for theft and burglary, he was killed when a 29-year-old officer discharged his sidearm. The other occupants, 19 and 23, were arrested without incident. |
| 1994-04-14 | Müller, Jochen | 28 | Berlin | Berlin | A police officer foiled a burglary at the women's center in Berlin-Mitte and had arrested two of the three suspects. While searching for the third with his weapon drawn, the missing suspect attempted to attack the officer with a knife upon being found, being shot in the head from below the chin at a distance of 50 cm. |
| 1994-06-16 | D., Sebastian | 19 | Kyritz | Brandenburg | 35-year-old plainclothed officer Gerald K. fired a warning shot in order to placate seven Romanian burglars at a scene and alert his colleagues. When one of them attempted to escape, the officer beat him in the neck with his sidearm, during which a shot was fired by accident, injuring the burglar who died in a hospital in Frankfurt an der Oder. The deceased and his accomplices were suspected of having committed around 500 break-ins as part of a larger gang. The officer was subsequently tried and sentenced to 8 months probation on 20 August 1996. |
| 1994-06-30 | Dener, Halim | 16 | Hannover | Lower Saxony | Halim Dener, a Kurdish refugee from Turkey, was putting up flyers around Steintor for the German branch of the PKK (which had been recently declared a terrorist organization in Germany) as part of his activism in the Kurdish independence movement. The boy was seen by two plainclothed SEK officers, who restrained him when he attempted escape. 28-year-old officer Klaus T. then dropped his service weapon and while picking it up, the gun went off, striking and killing Dener from a distance of 5–15 cm. No one was charged. |
| 1994-07-06 | Piro, Antonio | 31 | Frankfurt am Main | Hessen | Two robbers were fleeing from police after a botched hold-up at a Ramada hotel in Griesheim. One of the robbers, an Italian national, overpowered one of the pursuing officers and injured him with a gunshot. Another officer fatally shot the robber before he could finish off his colleague. The accomplice was caught by Dutch police in December, admitting to participating in several other robberies with the deceased. |
| 1994-07-12 | N.N. | 20 | Wiesbaden | Hessen | Two female police officers were pursuing a Bulgarian robber fleeing the scene of a crime. The robber eventually attacked the officers with a knife, leaving one with life-threatening injuries, before the other killed him with seven shots. |
| 1994-08-30 | Bankole, Kola | 30 | Frankfurt am Main | Hessen | A Nigerian asylum seeker was slated for air deportation to Lagos and was gagged and tied to the seat of the grounded plane at Frankfurt Airport by four BGS officers. When a physician working for the police administered a sedative injection, Bankole died of asphyxiation due to the sedative and pressure on his chest exacerbating a pre-existing heart condition. Nigeria's then-Ambassador to Germany Akinjide Osuntokun subsequently alleged that 25 Nigerian citizens had died "in police custody or under dubious circumstances" in the country since 1991. An official investigation concluded that only three deaths (that of Bankole and two suicides) occurred in police custody, with Kola Bankole being the only one that could be directly correlated to police action. |
| 1994-08-04 | N.N. | 32 | Lüdenscheid | Nordrhein-Westfalen | Police engaged a Yugoslavian man in a car chase after he had threatened his girlfriend with a gun while drunk, during which he breaks through street blockades. Upon being forced to stop, an officer approached the vehicle to arrest the man and shot him when he threatened the officer's life with the gun in his possession. |
| 1994-09-20 | N.N. | 37 | Konstanz | Baden-Württemberg | A man slated for confinement to a mental institution violently resisted during a preceding medical examination at a hospital and escaped the building. When police found the man hiding in a nearby garden, he stabbed one of the officers in the hand and was shot when he raised the knife again. |
| 1994-11-20 | N.N. | 16 | Rodgau | Hessen | Police took notice of a vehicle that was reported as stolen the prior week being driven by three teenagers. When they attempted to stop the vehicle with a road block, the car tried to run down one of the officers, who was able to jump out of the way and shoot at the driver, a German-born American national, killing him instantly. The other occupants, a 15-year-old girl and a 17-year-old boy, were arrested. |

== 1995 ==
| Date (YYYY-MM-DD) | Name | Age | Place | State | Summary of events |
|---|---|---|---|---|---|
| 1995-01-25 | Dobrick, Henner | 52 | München | Bayern | Reports of an individual aiming a handgun at passerby led police to storm the apartment of a man who had been described as "mentally unstable, but good-natured". The man was found hiding behind a closet door holding two pistols and after ignoring multiple warning shots, he was fatally shot three times by officers. The weapons in his hands were found to be toy guns. The deceased was an assistant director in German television, including Marienhof and Tatort, where he had a minor acting credit. |
| 1995-02-11 | Nelson, Sammy | 26 | München | Bayern | A Liberian asylum seeker was severely beaten by police officers while he resisted arrest at a container bay in Altstadt until he stopped moving and died at the scene. Police denied eyewitness reports that the man had been beaten bloody and stated that he had instead died after swallowing an unknown substance. |
| 1995-03-13 | N.N. | 42 | Wuppertal | Nordrhein-Westfalen | Two police officers respond to a report of a man threatening a woman, his ex-partner, with a gun. The man subsequently shot at the female officer, injuring her lightly, before her male counterpart fatally shot the attacker. |
| 1995-03-13 | N.N. | | Speyer | Rheinland-Pfalz | A man was threatening his wife with a bread knife during an argument. The man then lunged at the first police officer who entered the room and was immediately shot by him. |
| 1995-03-13 | N.N. | 41 | Stuttgart | Baden-Württemberg | Police were called to deal with a rowdy customer at a radio store. The customer was able to snag a policewoman's sidearm and engaged the officers in a shootout while fleeing, eventually being shot. |
| 1995-04-04 | Carbonai, Lino Guido | 35 | Selfkant | Nordrhein-Westfalen | A patrol car randomly passed by the scene of an active bank robbery in Süsterseel. One officer, 55-year-old Norbert Domnick, attempted to enter the bank when one of the robbers stormed out to face him. Both were killed in the ensuing fire exchange. The second robber managed to escape while 40,000 DM were found on the deceased robber. Police connected the pair to at least four other robberies on the German-Dutch border. |
| 1995-04-05 | N.N. | 30 | Wolfsburg | Niedersachsen | Police were called about a man holding a gun and a gas canister. When arrived, the man threw away the weapon in his hand and covered himself in the contents of the canister. When he pulled out another gun, later found to be a detailed gas pistol, officers shot him. |
| 1995-04-06 | N.N. | 24 or 26 | Berlin | Berlin | Following a string of robberies targeting the same gas station in Tempelhof, five plainclothed police officers monitor the area. They were in the process of apprehending a robber who had attempted to flee the scene when he pulled out a gas pistol and began threatening one of the female officers, leading to him being shot from behind. The deceased, a Nigerian national, was suspected of having also been responsible for a robbery at another gas station in adjacent Schöneberg the prior day. |
| 1995-05-11 | N.N. | 30 | Stendal | Sachsen-Anhalt | A man gained entry to the armory of a police station and immediately shot one of the officers there in the thigh. The other officers then opened fire on the intruder who died of his wounds shortly after. |
| 1995-07-28 | Bor, Leon | 31 | Köln | Nordrhein-Westfalen | Cologne hostage crisis: A Russian-born Israeli national hijacked a tourist bus in Deutz and held the 25 people inside hostage for seven hours. He killed two of the occupants and critically injured two people, a police officer and a passenger, with gunshots. Four people were able to escape during the stand-off. The hostage-taker was fatally shot by SEK. |
| 1995-08-17 | Ladwiniec, Adam | 54 | Hanerau-Hademarschen | Schleswig-Holstein | An unmarked police car engaged a vehicle with Polish registration in a car chase after the driver had accelerated upon noticing the other vehicle following closely. The men inside, a father-son pair from Biała Podlaska, believed they were being pursued by robbers and eventually pulled over to call police. The two plainclothed officers approached the car with their guns drawn, at which point the driver grabbed the gun of 37-year-old patrol leader Theo Holtorf and shot him dead. The other officer then fatally shot the driver. |
| 1995-09-12 | N.N. | 36 | Artern | Thüringen | Police were in the process of arresting several men who they had just caught attempting to break into a supermarket. During the arrest of one, an officer's gun discharged and killed one of the suspects. The officer was tried for the death. |
| 1995-09-14 | T., Bozkurt | 25 | Berlin | Berlin | A Turkish man wanted for a jewelry store robbery was stopped by police in Kreuzberg when they recognized his licence plate. The robber opened fire, endangering the lives of several passerby, and had to be gunned down by the officers. |
| 1995-09-22 | M., Manuell | 19 | München | Bayern | A gas station was being robbed in the early morning, during which the robber threatened a gas station attendant, a police officer working part-time there, with a gas pistol. The attendant made use of his service weapon and, after a short firefight, the robber was fatally shot in the head. |
| 1995-10-17 | Enkelmann, Reinhard | 40 | Kamp-Lintfort | Nordrhein-Westfalen | A call was placed asking for help from police, directing them to town center. There, the two arriving officers were immediately shot at by a gunman, whom they swiftly shot and killed. |
| 1995-10-21 | N.N. | 36 | Hamburg | Hamburg | Two police officers responded to a call from a woman whose ex-boyfriend had broken into her apartment. Upon their arrival, they found both in the stairwell, with the woman fleeing downstairs while the man pointed a pistol at police, refusing several orders to put down the weapon and instead opening fire. He was subsequently shot by the officers. |
| 1995-10-23 | P., Erich Willy | 63 | Hagen | Nordrhein-Westfalen | During a break-in at a warehouse, a burglar was locked in by the night-shift janitor, who then contacted police. As the officers searched the building, one of them was jumped by the burglar, the assault inadvertently causing the officer's gun to go off, killing the attacker. |
| 1995-12-01 | N.N. | 16 | Speyer | Rheinland-Pfalz | After seven robberies targeting pizza delivery workers over a two-week period, a 35-year-old police officer, accompanied by a 36-year-old colleague, went undercover to deliver a suspiciously placed order. At the location, the officer was confronted by a gun-wielding teenager demanding money from him. The officer identified himself as police, but as the robber did not follow orders to lower the weapon, the officer fired several gunshots, emptying his magazine. The robber was killed and determined to have been carrying a gas pistol. |
| 1995-12-03 | N.N. | | Braunschweig | Niedersachsen | Police were called when a woman reported two possible burglars entering a toolshed on a neighbouring property. The officers were shot at upon arriving, leading to a shootout that left one of the burglars dead and one officer with life-threatening injuries. |
| 1995-12-07 | N.N. | 39 | Bottrop | Nordrhein-Westfalen | Police were about to search a man in his parked car on a footpath in Vonderort, when the driver drove away with the officers in pursuit, abandoning his car at a cul-de-sac. After the officers fired a warning shot, the man pulled out a submachine gun and shot at them several timees as he attempted to escape in a truck. Police returned fire, fatally injuring the man who was later found in a courtyard and died in a hospital. His car was stolen and adorned with a stolen licence, one of several found inside the vehicle. Also recovered were a police frequence radio, a police siren, a large caliber pistol and several magazines. |
| 1995-12-08 | N.N. | 36 | München | Bayern | Police were called to an apartment in which a man had taken his girlfriend hostage after receiving a child support claim letter from his ex-wife. The situation escalated when the aggressor began firing wildly with a gun, killing a police dog, and while the girlfriend managed to flee, the man took a police officer hostage in her place. Three hours later, the hostage-taker tried to flee with the officer, leading to SEK fatlly shooting him. |
| 1995-12-23 | N.N. | 43 | Frankfurt am Main | Hessen | SEK responded to a family dispute in Fechenheim between Serb Orthodox Christians and Serb Muslims. The presumed instigator was seen leaving the property as soon as police arrived. When officers attempted to stop him, he opened fire on them, hitting one in the calf before he was shot and killed by the other officers. |
| 1995-XX-XX | N.N. | 24 | Dortmund | Nordrhein-Westfalen | During a midnight summer shift at a police station, a 36-year-old officer was the sole staff member present when a traveller entered and asked for directions to a southern area of the Münsterland. While showing the man a road map, the traveller suddenly made commented "Women are our plight", causing the officer to step back in surprise. The traveller then demanded the officer's gun and punched him in the face, briefly knocking him unconscious. On the ground, both struggled for the gun, with the attacker biting the officer's arms before managing to fire a gunshot above the officer's head. The officer turned the gun around mid-fight and fired a second gunshot, which struck the attacker. The attacker died at the scene shortly after Kripo arrived. |

== 1996 ==
| Date (YYYY-MM-DD) | Name | Age | Place | State | Summary of events |
|---|---|---|---|---|---|
| 1996-01-16 | N.N. | 38 | Köln | Nordrhein-Westfalen | A Turkish man was slashing at his wife with a butcher's knife on farm grounds. He was fatally injured by intervening police's gunfire. |
| 1996-01-16 | Odabasi, Kenan | 21 | Bünde | Nordrhein-Westfalen | A Turkish man with mental problems was threatening his family with a knife. SEK attempted to calm him down when he lunged at one of the officers and stabbed him, with his armor preventing injury. The attacker was then shot dead by another officer. |
| 1996-02-06 | Finkl, Helmut | 25 | Dachau | Bayern | A suicidal man wearing tactical gear took 12 people hostage at a dentist's office with a gun and a fake handgrenade. During the phone negotiations via employees, the hostage-taker only demanded that a sniper be positioned outside the building. Around eight hours later, he released all but one of the hostages, a doctor's assistant and threatened to kill her if police didn't shoot him. SEK attempted to covertly secure the hostage from a room as the hostage-taker was distracted, but a noise gave them away and the two officers ended up firing four shots on the man to ensure their own safety; the gun turned out to be a gas pistol. |
| 1996-02-08 | N.N. | 44 | Berlin | Berlin | An inmate scheduled for surgery slipped out of his bindings and escaped his escorts. Two judicial officers gave chase and fired two warning shots as the inmate entered the Amrumer Straße U-Bahn. A 57-year-old officer fatally shot the inmate at the underground level, with a ricochet also injuring an 85-year-old passerby in her calf. The deceased was serving a six-month sentence for theft and due for release in March, but he had pending charges for another theft offense and assault, as well as an ongoing investigation for rape. An investigation into the officer was halted in December when it was decided that the use of his fiream had been justified, despite the inmate having still been handcuffed. The officer was cleared of wrongdoing in December. |
| 1996-04-06 | K., Deniz | 25 | München | Bayern | A suspected drug dealer threatened a police officer with a gas pistol as he was being arrested during a drug raid. The officer's partner stated that he fired one shot at the suspect, killing him, yet medical examination showed that the victim had two gunshot wounds, with witnesses corroborating that two shots had been fired. The criminal investigative office explained this saying that the bullet had ricocheted back out on a rib. |
| 1996-04-08 | N.N. | 51 | Hürth | Nordrhein-Westfalen | A mentally ill man threatened his parents and arriving police with two sabres. Officers attempted to disarm the man by shooting him in the arms, instead resulting in his death. |
| 1996-06-11 | Laurisch, Gabriele | 46 | Hebertshausen | Bayern | 36-year-old police officer Peter Roth killed his ex-girlfriend and her new boyfriend. He convinced her to let him drive her to a stockbroker he knew for a lucrative investment. Roth forced her to drink roofied cocoa at gunpoint, then drove out to the woods, where he decapitated the unconscious woman, cut off her hands with an axe to delay identification and stole 130,000 DM she brought for the investment from her. Knowing that she had told her boyfriend about her whereabouts, Roth then drove to his house, claiming that she was at the hospital for a car accident and was going to drive him over. The boyfriend was also forced to drink the sedative and dismembered in the same woods, where he buried the body parts. The bodies were found on 11 July and Roth was apprehended eight days later. In July 1997, he was found guilty of two charges of murder and sentenced to life imprisonment. |
| 1996-06-11 | Keil, Thilo | 28 | Hebertshausen | Bayern | |
| 1996-07-27 | N.N. | 18 | Münster | Nordrhein-Westfalen | A car thief was shot after leading police on a high-speed chase. The circumstances around the shooting were initially unclear, until a special commission found that the car thief had been killed as a result of an accidental discharge. |
| 1996-08-31 | N.N. | 25 | Mühlacker | Baden-Württemberg | Two men attempted to defraud a gas station in Enzberg. During their escape from police, the men took a hostage. A fire exchange between them and the police killed one of the men and heavily injured the hostage. |
| 1996-10-03 | Grünewalt, Thomas | 36 | Karlsruhe | Baden-Württemberg | A 25-year old police officer accidentally shot and killed his superior during an unsanctioned target practice exercise at Oststadt police precinct because he had forgotten to unload his sidearm. |
| 1996-10-04 | T., Vasilios | 28 | Nürnberg | Bayern | During a routine check at Nürnberg train station, a Greek man fled from police. A 20-year-old policewoman fired at the man, fatally striking him in the back. The deceased was a known drug user and former police informant. On 24 January 1997, the officer was sentenced to pay a four-digit fine. |
| 1996-11-04 | N.N. | 34 | Burghaun | Hessen | A blackmailer who had demanded 450,000 DM from his former employer was chased into some nearby woods by a SEK officer following a ransom hand-off. During the arrest, the officer fired three shots at the blackmailer, one fatal, when he saw him carrying a gun, later identified as a gas pistol. It is uncertain whether the officer had been ordered to pursue the blackmailer after the ransom was paid. |
| 1996-11-14 | Yaradan, Bahri | 25 | Fürth | Bayern | Police drove after a motorist that made a sudden U-turn upon seeing the officers' car. After a lengthy chase, police went to arrest the driver, a Turkish national, when "a shot discharged" from one of the officers' guns by accident and struck the motorist in the head. |

== 1997 ==
| Date (YYYY-MM-DD) | Name | Age | Place | State | Summary of events |
|---|---|---|---|---|---|
| 1997-01-26 | N.N. | 27 | Brigachtal | Baden-Württemberg | A man was killed by two shots by officers during a police operation. No more details were given and reports say that "closer circumstances were unclear". |
| 1997-02-08 | N.N. | 23 | Fürstenwalde | Brandenburg | Six officers responded to a burglary report, startling the three perpetrators, all Romanian nationals, at the scene, who attempt to make a run for it. During the foot chase, an officer's gun accidentally went off, killing one of the burglars. |
| 1997-02-11 | Geiger, Thomas | 29 | München | Bayern | Following a bank robbery, the robber was found by two officers at a S-Bahn station. He then pulled out a gun, leading to the officers firing a total of ten shots at him, with four hitting and killing the robber. The robber was presumed to have not fired a shot himself, as no recent traces of gunpowder were found on the weapon. |
| 1997-02-28 | Warzywoda, Michael | 32 | Uhingen | Baden-Württemberg | A drunk driver with a suspended licence fled from a traffic stop, managing to evade four road blocks before being apprehended at the driveway of his home. According to later testimony, three officers approached the vehicle when one of them tripped and accidentally discharged a shot from his sidearm. The other officers, apparently assuming their colleague had been shot, each fired one shot at the driver as well. The projectiles fatally hit the man in the head, right thigh and right lower arm. The officers were investigated, starting on 8 March, to no result. |
| 1997-03-15 | N.N. | 33 | Frankfurt am Main | Hessen | A 39-year-old police officer killed his ex-girlfriend, an Iranian national, with eight shots from his service weapon. He opened fire during a court hearing in Nordend over the officer being sued for alimony. After reloading, the officer also heavily injured the deceased's 49-year-old lawyer with three shots and shot at the judge who was unharmed. The officer was at the time also being tried for grievous bodily harm. |
| 1997-04-08 | N.N. | 29 | Stuttgart | Baden-Württemberg | During a manhunt for a bank robber in Hofen, the getaway vehicle of the robber was stopped by police as part of the search. The robber immediately fired on the parked police car with a shotgun, critically injuring a 21-year old officer, before his 32-year old partner shot the robber, who later died at a hospital of his wounds. The deceased had been recently released from prison after being paroled for committing a string of bank robberies since 1985. |
| 1997-06-23 | N.N. | 44 | Frankfurt am Main | Hessen | A truck driver was having his apartment searched due to suspicions of involvement in cigarette smuggling across the German-Polish border. The man pulled out a pistol fired one shot that missed the officers, who shot the attacker in the chest, dying at a hospital. A large quantity of cigarettes and 240,000 DM were found in the apartment. |
| 1997-07-24 | H., Ernst | 34 | München | Bayern | Police were called to investigate reports of a suicide threat. Two officers were then threatened by the source of the threats, a mentally unstable man holding a butcher's knife, who then threatened the officers. The female officer shot the man in the throat, leading to his death at a hospital the same day. The deceased had checked out of a voluntary stay at a mental hospital ten days earlier. |
| 1997-08-23 | N.N. | 35 | Berlin | Berlin | Three burglars attempted to run over a police officer patrolling an industrial quarter in Hohenschönhausen with a delivery van. The officer fired a shot at the driver's cabin and after the truck came to a halt, two of the men fled the vehicle while the third, a Polish national with an arrest warrant, slumped out of his seat onto the street, dying at the scene. |
| 1997-09-15 | N.N. | | Bremen | Bremen | A bank robber wielding a sawn-off shotgun was engaged in a shootout with pursuing police in Neustadt. When the robber was cornered in a back alley, he again opened fire and was killed by the officers. |
| 1997-10-16 | Geil, Herbert | 48 | Breitscheid | Hessen | A debtor in Erdbach was being made subject to eviction when he shot and killed 49 year old Bernd Dietermann, the bailiff enforcing the court order, with a sawn-off pump action shotgun. As Dietermann had been accompanied by four police officers to aid him in the eviction, the debtor was engaged in a shootout. After reportedly tossing his gun to the side to let officers arrest him, one officer fatally shot him in the back. There had been several failed attempts to have the man involuntarily committed for psychiatric issues since 1990. |
| 1997-12-08 | Rose, Hans-Jürgen | 36 | Dessau | Sachsen-Anhalt | A machinist was held at the Dessau-Roßlau police station for drunk driving. Just under two hours after his recorded release, the man was found barely conscious and slumped over near a house entrance not far from the station and died in a hospital from internal hemorrhaging the same morning. His injuries included a torn off lung, a broken jaw, dislodged teeth, crushed testicles, and a shattered lumbar vertebra that exposed his spinal canal and had resulted in complete paraplegia. The severity of the injuries initially led medical attendees to believe he had been involved in a car collision or a fall from several stories, but no signs of any such accidents were found in the area. The officers who had last seen the deceased suggested that he may have sustained his wounds by leaping from a window. The coroner subsequently opined that due to parallel patterns of the bruises he found during his medical examination that the deceased was tied to a pillar and beaten with metal batons at the station. Investigations were ceased in October 2002 and a renewed investigation again ended in February 2014. Dessau-Roßlau police station later became embroiled in more misconduct scandals, including the 2002 death of Mario Bichtemann, who died in a cell from head trauma after being booked for public intoxication, the 2005 death of Oury Jalloh and the suspected obstruction of justice by married police officers Ramone and Jörg S., who was station chief at the time, regarding the investigation into the 2016 murder of Yangjie Li, in which their son Sebastian Flech was found to be the perpetrator. |
| 1997-12-19 | N.N. | 39 | Egelsbach | Hessen | Two police officers were responding to a call of domestic violence. When one officer left the room with the 33-year old wife, the husband, a Croatian national, shot remaining policeman, 36-year-old Heinz-Peter Braun. Upon hearing the commotion, the other officer returned and killed the husband when the weapon was aimed at him. The injured officer died of his wounds in a hospital. |
| 1997-12-20 | N.N. | 43 | Straubing | Bayern | A 16-year-old boy called police after his neighbour threatened to kill him and fired three gunshots though his front door. When a plainclothed police officer rang the neighbour's doorbell, the man aimed a gun at the officer, who then fatally shot him in the head. The weapon was found to be a gas pistol. The previous day, the deceased had reported a burglary in an empty flat on the same floor and voiced his belief that the teenage boy was responsible, leading investigators to believe that the neighbour had attempted extreme vigilantism. |
| 1997-12-28 | N.N. | 70 | Ingolstadt | Bayern | Police responded to a call by a woman asking for help over her husband, who was "going on a rampage" in their home. The arriving officers were attacked by the knife-wielding husband, leading to one firing a shot in the man's thigh in "evident self-defense". The husband died of blood loss in a hospital. |

== 1998 ==
| Date (YYYY-MM-DD) | Name | Age | Place | State | Summary of events |
|---|---|---|---|---|---|
| 1998-01-12 | N.N. | | Hünxe | Nordrhein-Westfalen | A police officer was shot at while conducting a traffic stop on a parking lot at A3. The occupant of the car he was checking had opened fire and hit him in the legs and chest. The shooter was killed when the officer returned fire. |
| 1998-01-25 | N.N. | 68 | Ludwigshafen | Rheinland-Pfalz | Several passerby alert police that they had been shot at by someone inside a nearby apartment building. When officers knocked on the door of the flat in question, the man opening it immediately fired at them with a blank gun. One officer then fatally shot the man. |
| 1998-01-29 | N.N. | 22 | Florstadt | Hessen | A neighbour called police over a break-in happening at the post office by her residence in Nieder-Florstadt. Police presence caused the three attempted safecrackers to flee and during the chase, a female officer fired a shot that killed one of the burglars. The deceased and another arrested burglar were Romanian nationals. |
| 1998-04-06 | Petrović, Mile | 37 | Düsseldorf | Nordrhein-Westfalen | SEK were raiding the last known place of residence of a Yugoslavian national, wanted for violent offenses. The offender immediately fired at them when they entered and was shot seven times in return. Police found a hand grenade within arm's length by the offender, who died in a hospital later that day. |
| 1998-04-07 | N.N. | 15 | Hofheim | Hessen | A 21-year-old police officer killed his teenage brother through an accidental discharge of his service weapon. |
| 1998-04-13 | N.N. | 25 | Bad Klosterlausnitz | Thüringen | 32-year-old LKA police officer Enrico Erben killed the fiancé of his stepdaughter with at least two shots in the neck and back. Erben had been sexually abusing his 12-year-old biological daughter and 13-year-old stepdaughter, and was thrown out of the house after police were called. He returned the following day and was confronted by his future son-in-law, as well as the 45-year-old mother of the girls. After the killing, the officer fled to Bavaria via A8 and was surrounded at a rest stop in Traunstein district. He critically injured a 45-year-old police officer with a gunshot and was able to escape after briefly taking a 28-year-old man hostage. Following extensive negotiations over radio, the officer surrendered in Piding, ending the 13-hour rampage. On 6 May 1999, Erben was sentenced to life imprisonment for murder, attempted manslaughter, kidnapping, dangerous assault, and rape. |
| 1998-10-30 | N.N. | | Plaaz | Mecklenburg-Vorpommern | A man fired several shots at the house of his ex-wife and fled when police arrived. He proceeded to take potshots at the pursuing squad car and was then shot by the officers. |
| 1998-11-28 | T., Robert | 48 | München | Bayern | A man called police as his younger brother, who was schizophrenic and suffering from paranoid persecutory delusions, was threatening to kill himself. Shouts for help led officers to forcefully enter the apartment in Maxvorstadt, where they found the brother stabbing the caller with a bread knife. The brother then charged at the officers and when tear gas proved ineffective, 23-year old police officer Martina Drosta fired two shots at the attacker. One bullet pierced through the target and struck the caller standing behind him in the head. The attacker died of his injuries in a hospital a few hours later. The officer, who had finished training only weeks earlier, was retired and treated for PTSD in the following years, publishing a memoir about the incident in 2009. In 2010, the Bavarian state demanded that two grantees of the deceased brothers' will, their two U.S. and Israel-based aunts, pay 70,000 euro to compensate the government for the officer's treatment, holding them accountable as the closest relatives of the attacker. |
| 1998-11-28 | T., Leon | 51 | München | Bayern | |
| 1998-12-25 | N.N. | 23 | Grüne | Sachsen | A woman called police over an escalating argument with her partner. The partner ended up being shot by police under unclear circumstances. |

== 1999 ==
| Date (YYYY-MM-DD) | Name | Age | Place | State | Summary of events |
|---|---|---|---|---|---|
| 1999-01-17 | N.N. | 19 | Karlsruhe | Baden-Württemberg | Being on high alert following a string of bank robberies, a car was stopped by the police. The driver, identified as the wanted robber, attempted to escape but was later stopped again. One officer opened fire, killing the driver. A gas pistol was found in the car. |
| 1999-03-25 | N.N. | 44 | Ennigerloh | Nordrhein-Westfalen | A mentally ill person attacked his sister with an axe. When police arrived he was shot to protect the relative's life. |
| 1999-04-13 | N.N. | 41 | Lambrecht | Rheinland-Pfalz | A drunk man rioted inside his apartment and started a fire. When police arrived, he attacked them with a metal rod. He was shot and later died in hospital. |
| 1999-04-16 | H., Xhevdet | 26 | Neuberg | Hessen | A makeshift alarm system alerted the operators of a kiosk when they heard voices through a baby monitor at night, leading to them calling police. When officers arrived at the scene, the four burglars emerged and ran into different directions. One of the younger men was found hiding behind a hedge and ran at a 33-year old officer while holding a piece of metal. After repeated warnings, the man was shot in the shoulder at point blank range, with the bullet ricocheting and fatally severing his aorta. The remaining three were caught in the area and Frankfurt, being identified as ethnic Kosovo Albanian refugees who were part of the same family (two brothers and their adult sons). |
| 1999-04-24 | N.N. | 22 | Bad Arolsen | Hessen | Two burglars were caught breaking into a kiosk. Upon police arrival, one suspect fled while the other jumped through the glass door and attacked officers with a crowbar. He was shot in the chest and managed to run down the street before collapsing, dying in the ambulance. |
| 1999-05-28 | Ageeb, Aamir | 30 | German airspace, Flight LH588 | Deutschland | A Sudanese citizen who resisted his deportation, Ageeb was killed due to positional asphyxia caused by fixation. Three Bundesgrenzschutz officers were charged with voluntary manslaughter, but remained in office due to a reduced sentence. In the aftermath, the fixation techniques that were used, have been declared to be torture by the Committee for the Prevention of Torture. |
| 1999-06-11 | Z., Saffet | 43 | Hamburg | Hamburg | A Turkish man was rioting in his house in Eimsbüttel. When police arrived he injured an officer with a knife and was shot by another officer. |
| 1999-06-29 | B., Thomas | 29 | Hamburg | Hamburg | Residents of an apartment complex in Hummelsbüttel called police to report a noise complaint. The prior day, someone had reported female screaming from the same flat, but the woman inside had assured officers that nothing had occurred. This time, when four officers rang the bell, the door was opened by a man with a switchblade in his hand, who immediately shut the door on them. While the officers attempted to kick it down, the man suddenly flung the door open and attacked. Two officers were holding him back and ordering to drop the knife when he again lunged at an officer, being shot by two of them and dying at the scene. The deceased was later found to be a known drug addict. |
| 1999-06-27 | Beate, Friedhelm | 62 | Heldrungen | Thüringen | Hotel visitors mistakenly identified another guest, a hiker from Cologne, as fugitive murderer and serial robber Dieter Zurwehme, who killed four people that recognised him while on the run. Two plainclothed officers, aged 30 and 44, had the receptionist call out for the guest through the door and when the man peeked through the frame to see the two armed men outside in place of the employee, he shut the door and held it shut, believing the officers to be robbers. Police fired twice through the door, killing the man with a shot in the heart. The case against the shooters was dropped in December. |
| 1999-07-23 | Hammerschmidt, Udo | 41 | Hamburg | Hamburg | MEK raided an apartment in Eimsbüttel after an anonymous tip-off that accused the tenant of running a large-scale cocaine and marijuana dealing operation. Police broke open the door with a battering ram at night and shot the tenant twice in the stomach when he pointed a gas pistol at him. He later died in a hospital. Although the deceased had been previously convicted of drug and theft offenses, only 13 grams of hashish were found. The gas pistol had been legally in his possession, having bought it after a break-in. Two acquaintances who stayed over the night of the shooting also said that officers had neglected to turn on the light or identify themselves. |
| 1999-08-09 | K., Maik | 22 | Magdeburg | Sachsen-Anhalt | SEK raided the apartment of a serial robber who had killed a 29-year-old man in a retail store. Even though the police officers used stun grenades, they were shot at seven times with a revolver, heavily wounding one SEK officer despite wearing a bullet-proof vest. The attacker was hit twice and mortally wounded in the ensuing shootout. |
| 1999-09-01 | H., André | 28 | Berlin | Berlin | Police were engaged in a car chase with a serial robber who had held up a post office in Tetlow when it came to a shootout in Zehlendorf. The robber was able to escape and was later found dead, having succumbed to three gunshot wounds he sustained in the firefight, including one that pierced his lungs. He was identified as a former Berlin-Tempelhof police officer who had quit the force in February of the same year after 12 years of service. A 20-year old accomplice was later arrested while an ex-colleague was investigated, but ultimately not charged. |
| 1999-09-06 | N.N. | 40 | Bremen | Bremen | A woman called police because her neighbour was sneaking around her house while holding a switchblade. When police arrived at the man's house, he crawled out of a window and stabbed a 38-year-old officer. The attacker was shot six times and died at the scene of three gunshots to the stomach. The deceased, a Lebanese national who had moved to Germany in 1998 with his wife and eight children, was noted for mental illness and had planned to return to Lebanon. |
| 1999-09-09 | Schüssler, Patrick | 14 | Uelzen | Niedersachsen | 48-year old officer Klaus-Henning O. was driving home drunk from work with his private vehicle and struck a teenage cyclist while driving 90 km/h. The youth was killed instantly and flung from the street along with his bike. Witnesses recounted that the officer exited his car to assess the damage to the bonnet for a few minutes before driving off again. O. was arrested the next morning, admitting to drinking on the job and attested a 2 blood alcohol level, but claiming no memory of the incident. His trial was delayed until 2003 and resolved in 2005. For negligent homicide, he was sentenced to fines of 4,500 euro for drunk driving and hit-and-run, and an additional 5,000 euro as pain and suffering to the deceased's parents. |
| 1999-10-15 | N.N. | 43 | Passau | Bayern | Police were conducting a personal check on a man who was reported for behaving aggressively. When the man pulled out a knife, officers used tear gas to no effect. During the scuffle, an officer fell down and was jumped by the attacker, who was then shot and killed. The man had been diagnosed with paranoid schizophrenia, with recurrent episodes of anger. |
| 1999-11-24 | N.N. | 25 | Geldern | Nordrhein-Westfalen | When police encountered a presumed robber, he flew. When not responding to calls for him to stop, he was shot in the head from behind. |
| 1999-12-07 | N.N. | 31 | Braunschweig | Niedersachsen | A man injured two neighbors with a knife. When police officers tried to arrest him, he attacked them and was hit by police gunshots. The deceased was described as an "irritable justice fanatic", who was always armed due to paranoia of being attacked. |
| 1999-12-10 | Dimitrov, Zdravko Nikolov | 36 | Braunschweig | Niedersachsen | A Bulgarian physicist was supposed to be put into psychiatric care to await deportation after his asylum application was denied. The physicist had immigrated to Germany in 1992 claiming that he faced persecution under the new government for being a communist and previous involvement in the Dimitrov Communist Youth Union. It was claimed that he was barred from work, culminating in involuntary commitment and torture in a Sofia mental asylum, which the trauma center Zentrum Überleben attested to after finding poorly healed bruises on the physicist. The state nevertheless sought to fulfill the deportation and ordered confinement to a mental ward because of suicide threats. When he announced to kill himself with a knife, police officers called for assistance by the SEK. Officers used a stun grenade upon storming the flat and shot the man when he allegedly pointed the knife at them. He died in hospital ten days later. The officer who fired the killing shots was found not guilty of assault resulting in death in March 2000, when the shooting was judged as self-defence. |
| 1999-12-13 | N.N. | 45 | Siegen | Nordrhein-Westfalen | After a shootout in front of a nightclub, police raided the apartment of a suspect. In a melee with the suspect's father, a shot discharged from an officer's service pistol, hitting the man in the head. |
| 1999-12-22 | Hodzic, Adnan | 46 | Aachen | Nordrhein-Westfalen | Aachen hostage crisis: On 20 December, a Bosnian national with a prior record for false imprisonment, robbery and jailbreak robbed a bank at gunpoint and wielding hand grenades, but because he found the money inside the vault insufficient, he took three employees, the head of an armored car company, one of their drivers and a secretary, demanding 1 million mark. Over the course of the 50 hour hostage crisis, he repeatedly shot at police and to raise pressure, he critically injured the 30-year-old driver, who was tied to a pipe in a standing position and had a live grenade hung around his neck, with three gunshots. On the second night, the robber accidentally detonated one of the grenades after experiencing micro sleep due to staying awake for over a day, injuring the 30-year-old secretary with shrapnel. After intensive negotiation he was shot by a police marksman. |
| 1999-12-28 | N.N. | 69 | Darmstadt | Hessen | A retired man threatened people in the city center with a gun. When police officers arrived, he shot at them and was injured by a police bullet. He died two weeks later in a hospital. It is unclear whether the wound from the bullet caused his death. |

== See also ==
- Lists of killings by law enforcement officers
- Use of firearms by police in Germany
- List of killings by law enforcement officers in post-reunification Germany (2000s)
- List of killings by law enforcement officers in post-reunification Germany (2010s)
- List of killings by law enforcement officers in post-reunification Germany (2020s)
