= List of killings by law enforcement officers in post-reunification Germany (2000s) =

Listed below are people killed by non-military law enforcement officers in Germany after reunification in the 2000s, whether or not in the line of duty, irrespective of reason or method. Included, too, are cases where individuals died in police custody due to applied techniques. Inclusion in the list implies neither wrongdoing nor justification on the part of the person killed or the officer involved. The listing simply documents occurrences of deaths and is not complete.

== Statistics ==
Year	Number killed by use of firearms (official statistics)	Number killed by any means (counted)	Number of shots fired on persons
2000	6		52
2001	8		68
2002	7		42
2003	3		44
2004	9		63
2005	5		37
2006	6		At least 27
2007	12		46
2008	10		37
2009	6		57
Total	72		473

== 2000 ==
Date (YYYY-MM-DD)	Name	Age	Place	State	Summary of events
2000-01-24	N.N.	52	Schleiden	Nordrhein-Westfalen	In a state of confusion, a farmer and hunter in Dreiborn shot at a man and then at arriving police officers with a shotgun. An officer shot the farmer three times in the pelvis area, severing several arteries and his lungs. Despite several successful surgeries, the farmer died of a pulmonary embolism at a hospital on 20 February.
2000-01-27	N.N.	40	Mengen	Baden-Württemberg	A robber fled a supermarket with 10,000 DM and was arrested by police shortly after. He pointed his gun at the officers, who proceeded to shoot him two times.
2000-03-06	N.N.	24	Nürnberg	Bayern	A man who had been previously convicted of several crimes and did not return from prison furlough attempted to leave a gas station in Biebelried without paying the bill of 40 DM. A scan of the licence plate also found that it had been stolen from a different vehicle. He led five squad cars on a high-speed chase for over 90 km across A3 and rammed one before crashing into a guardrail near Autobahnkreuz Nürnberg. The man brandished a repainted toy gun at the officers when he exited and did not desist after several warnings, instead threatening two officers individually. One officer fired a shot, followed by a second firing two from his submachine gun, hitting the man in the back of the head.
2000-04-04	N.N.	22	Mannheim	Baden-Württemberg	A Turkish man stabbed his mother and a neighbour during a family argument, leaving the former with life-threatening injuries. When police arrived, he fired at them through a window in their home with a gas pistol. Officers shot back and hit the man three times in the torso.
2000-05-03	N.N.	28	Sigmaringen	Baden-Württemberg	During a foot chase, the pursued suspect threw a store sign on the ground, causing the officer behind him to trip. As he fell to the ground, a shot discharged from the officer's weapon, which fatally struck the suspect.
2000-09-19	Bui, Cong Khanh	28	Ulm	Baden-Württemberg	A woman called police after she saw a man cradling a rifle on a path in the woods. Police confronted the man at the path and ordered him to drop the weapon, but this only made him walk towards the officers, who then shot the man 22 times - 9 of the rounds hit their target, who died of a single bullet to the chest. It was later found that the man, a Vietnamese national, had been reported missing from a care facility, revealing that he was mentally handicapped due to childhood meninigits and had actually been holding an airsoft assault rifle, described as "serving the function of a stuffed toy" for the deceased, which officers did not recognize in the dark and foggy weather.

== 2001 ==
Date (YYYY-MM-DD)	Name	Age	Place	State	Summary of events
2001-01-26	Amadi, John	19	Düsseldorf	Nordrhein-Westfalen	A Nigerian asylum seeker was kicked, beaten, and choked by six narcotics agents during a drug raid at Worringer Platz. He subsequently stopped breathing and was declared dead at the scene. Police initially claimed that the man had swallowed small drug packages to hide evidence and died when one spontaneously ruptured without outside force, but an autopsy showed that no drugs were in his system.
2001-01-29	L., Mike	23	Berlin	Berlin	Police learnt through a tapped telephone line of the planning of a supermarket robbery at Anton Saefkow-Platz. SEK placed officers around the location and waited for the robbers to show themselves. Three armed men eventually approached the market, but were confronted by SEK in the entry hall. The ringleader managed to escape and gun in hand, he charged towards two officers, with another officer firing at the robber three times, hitting him once in the side and once in the back. The gun was found to be a gas pistol. The surviving robbers and three accomplices, two of whom were minors, were later determined to have participated in six robberies the previous year, during which a cashier was injured by gas pistol fire.
2001-03-07	C., Ali	25	Köln	Nordrhein-Westfalen	A convoy of police vehicles in Ehrenfeld was driving to respond to a call. At a red light, a Turkish man from Hürth stepped out of his car next to the convoy and threatened a bus of police officers behind him with a gun. Four police officers, aged 26 to 34, intervened, and shot five times at the driver, hitting him in the thigh, chin, shoulder, and face. He was able to run before collapsing on the rails of a nearby train station and died from a projectile piercing his brachial artery. The weapon turned out to have been a gas pistol, leading investigators to believe that the death was a case of suicide by cop, the first such case in Cologne. Despite official reports that the man's wife attested that the deceased had depression following the death of his mother, she denied ever saying this and accused police of unlawful killing.
2001-06-12	N.N.	27	Olpe	Nordrhein-Westfalen	A man wielding a screwdriver announced his intention to kill himself on a public street. Three police officers were able to convince the man to reconsider and instead visit a doctor. He agreed and as he was being escorted by one of the officers, the other two following closely behind, the man stabbed the officer accompanying him in the head without warning, causing life-threatening injuries. Another officer used pepper spray on the man and then shot him in the arm, both to no effect, ending with him fatally shooting the man in the neck.
2001-07-14	Sarr Wegener, N'deye Mareame	26	Aschaffenburg	Bayern	Police were alerted to the scene of an early hours custody dispute between a separated couple over their two-year-old child in which the husband requested full guardianship without his Senegalese wife's knowledge, after the husband called police when his wife confronted him about this at his apartment. The situation escalated when the wife refused to leave and instead grabbed a bread knife, stabbing one of the officers, cutting his hand. A second officer fired at her after a warning when she raised the knife to the first officer again, with reports conflicting on whether the shot struck her in the arm or her collar bone. Either way, bone shards hit the wife in the aorta, leading to her death from internal bleeding in a hospital just hours later. German African activist organizations blamed racism for the shooting, saying that lethal force would not have been used had the attacker been an ethnic German. It was also alleged that the recent change to hollow-point bullets made the usage of Bavarian police firearms more deadly than necessary. Both arguments were refuted in official police statements.
2001-08-05	N.N.	40	Gruibingen	Baden-Württemberg	Two police officers searched a furniture factory after an alarm was triggered. After finding no trace of a break-in, both officers left the building and shortly after, the submachine gun of one of the officer discharged and killed his colleague with a shot in the lung.
2001-09-16	N.N.	34	Hamburg	Hamburg	A 35-year-old police officer shot his wife six times with his sidearm in Bramfeld before killing himself. The wife was reanimated, but declared braindead at a hospital. The woman was having an affair and the officer had refused to divorce.
2001-12-08	John, Achidi	19	Hamburg	Hamburg	Police officers in St. Georg arrested Nigerian asylum seeker Michael Paul Nwabuisi, who was registered under the false identity as a Cameroonian national named Achidi John, because they assumend he was selling drugs and was a bodypacker. He was brought to the UKE, where a physician applied an emetic forcefully by a nasal tube. After the procedure he fell to the ground and died three days later from a combination of heart defect, the stress of the procedure, and the effects of cocaine, with a total of 45 pellets containing powdered and crack cocaine being recovered from his gastrointestinal track.
2001-12-24	N.N.	44	Leinburg	Bayern	A man with a long record for violent crime broke into the apartment of his ex-girlfriend and threatened her and her boyfriend who were both able to escape him. He then set the apartment on fire and attempted to attack two police officers arriving on the floor, with a 30-year old officer firing six shots in the attacker's stomach, chest, and shoulder from a range of 1,50 meters.
2001-XX-XX	N.N.			Nordrhein-Westfalen	Most statistics list 8 police shooting deaths in 2001, but two, listed as having occurred on 5 March and 3 April 2001, appear identical in reporting and location to two shootings that occurred on 6 March and 4 April in 2000. It's noted that police records only list 5 shooting deaths for 2001, due to often excluding cases where accidental discharges caused death. A 2004 article mentions an investigation into a potential coverup of a July 2001 police operation in Hennef, in which a suspect reportedly shot himself after a gunfight, with suspicions that he may have actually been killed by SEK.
2001-XX-XX	N.N.			Baden-Württemberg	Most statistics list 8 police shooting deaths in 2001, but two, listed as having occurred on 5 March and 3 April 2001, appear identical in reporting and location to two shootings that occurred on 6 March and 4 April in 2000. It's noted that police records only list 5 shooting deaths for 2001, due to often excluding cases where accidental discharges caused death.

== 2002 ==
Date (YYYY-MM-DD)	Name	Age	Place	State	Summary of events
2002-01-26	N.N.	45	Mühlhausen	Thüringen	A 47-year-old police officer killed his wife with his service weapon before killing himself. The officer had arrived to fetch his wife from a mental hospital for a routine weekend discharge. The wife had been a patient at the clinic since December 2001 and described to be recovering well.
2002-03-24	N.N.	63	Kreuzwertheim	Bayern	A man known for his violent tendencies was supposed to be brought to a mental hospital by police, but stabbed one of the officers with a knife while resisting. The officer's partner then shot and killed the man.
2002-04-05	N.N.	40	Düsseldorf	Nordrhein-Westfalen	A bank robber who made off with 5000 euro in Urdenbach was discovered hiding in a garden behind the bank by police. Two officers unsuccessfully attempted to restrain him and when he pulled out a gun, another officer fired a warning shot before shooting twice at the robber, fatally hitting him in the head.
2002-05-11	Neisius, Stephan	31	Köln	Nordrhein-Westfalen	Cologne police scandal: Police were called to the Neustadt-Süd apartment of a woman and her schizophrenic son, after a neighbour saw the latter breaking glass doors with a hockey stick after an argument about his refusal to have his thrombosis treated, also voicing her suspicion that he was being violent towards his mother. After being denied entry by the man, four officers broke open the door and attempted to arrest him. Due to heavy resistance that included bites, punches, kicks and a hammer throw, the officers used pepper spray and threw the man to the ground before handcuffing him. On the way to the transport vehicle, the man reportedly "slipped the officers' grasp" six times while descending five stories of staircase and during the ride, an officer, Lars S., is alleged to have hit him for repeatedly screaming "I am Jesus". According to two uninvolved police officers, once at the police station, the man was dragged to a cell and beaten by several officers while still in hand and foot restraints. He was lying in a puddle of blood when paramedics brought him to a hospital, where he suffered from a cardiac arrest and fell into a coma during which he died on 24 May. Six officers were charged with common bodily harm with fatal consequences and were removed from police service.
2002-05-28	N.N.	22	Wiesbaden	Hessen	A Pakistani man entered an optometrist's office and held an 18-year old employee, his ex-girlfriend, at gunpoint, allowing others in the practice to leave before he kept her hostage for three hours. He made repeated threats to kill the woman and himself, also firing several stray shots. Because the man told officers over the phone that he would not surrender, police attempted to take down the hostage taker by shooting him in the side. The bullet ended up traveling through the arm into the hip, leading to his death at a hospital a week later. The woman had previously filed a complaint for stalking and made explicit mention of her ex-boyfriend's repeated threats to commit a murder-suicide during and after their relationship.
2002-07-14	K., Peter	36	Hamburg	Hamburg	A drunk driver drove through a police checkpoint and continued to evade police until he drove his VW bus into the side of a house. He then fled to the roof of a multi-storey car park in Altona, where police surrounded him with guns drawn. According to the officer, as he was tried to pull the man back over the railing with one hand, his gun in the other hand accidentally discharged, hitting the driver, who proceeded to stumble backwards and die after a 10-meter fall.
2002-07-28	Bastubbe, René	30	Nordhausen	Thüringen	Police were called after residents saw two men hitting a faulty cigarette machine and attempted to escape police. One man was caught while the other escaped despite the use of pepper spray. The remaining man, who was under the influence of alcohol and cocaine, began throwing paving stones at officers and after repeated warnings, he was fatally shot by 30-year old officer René Strube while bending down for another brick, the bullet having gone through his back and become stuck in his collar bone. The death caused local outrage, as the deceased was a reformed far-right hooligan who renounced his ways in prison and befriended Holocaust survivors while working at the memorial site of the Mittelbau-Dora concentration camp. Strube was not charged and in 2019, he became a Landtag candidate for the AfD, causing outrage in leftist circles, including Die Linke.
2002-10-10	N.N.	48	Euskirchen	Nordrhein-Westfalen	A 34-year old female police officer strangled a woman to death in a church. The officer had recently stopped taking hormones she was prescribed following thyroid cancer surgery at her doctor's orders and was suffering from psychotic depressive episodes as a result. She took temporary illness from her job and was being observed at a hospital when she left to repeat the Lord's Prayer at a nearby cathedral. The officer stated that she felt "bothered" by another woman lighting a candle and then heard voices in her mind that said the visitor was "sent by Satan", leading her to put the woman in a headlock until she stopped breathing. The officer was arrested at the scene and temporarily put in psychiatric care. She was found not guilty of murder in December of the same year and received no punishment, due to inculpability on account of mental illness at the time, yet no remaining danger posed since the hormone therapy ended.
2002-11-22	N.N.	45	Bad Nauheim	Hessen	A man shot his wife at her workplace at a supermarket after an argument. The man then called the police, but refused to either exit the building or let emergency services take his injured wife. SEK stormed the market to secure the hostage, leading to a shootout that left the husband mortally injured and an officer lightly wounded. The shooter died before midnight at a hospital.
2002-12-01	Syrokowski, Robert	18	Lübeck	Schleswig-Holstein	A couple in St. Jürgen called police because a drunk teenager had ringed their doorbell in the middle of night and claimed to live at the house. Two police officers, 40-year-old Alexander M. and 52-year-old Hans Joachim G., arrived to take the teenager away, supposedly to a drunk tank at the police station, but instead dropped him off at a country road outside of their jurisdiction at 3 degrees Celsius with the nearest town (Bliestorf) being 7 kilometers away. He walked for two kilometers before he was fatally struck by a car. The officers were convicted of negligent homicide and sentenced to one and a half years and nine months imprisonment respectively.
2002-12-07	Hühr, Wolfgang	35	Stralsund	Mecklenburg-Vorpommern	Police were called after a homeless man collapsed at a liquor store. The man regained consciousness shortly after, with the store owner asking officers to "get rid of the disturbance" despite their protests. The man was loaded into the police car despite his objections and driven to a rural outer borough of the city, where he was left on the side of the road. The man died in the night from hypothermia, hastened by alcohol intoxication. The officers were convicted of negligent homicide and sentenced to three years and three months imprisonment in July 2003.
2002-12-24	V., Julio	25	Hamburg	Hamburg	Police were called to an apartment complex in Uhlenhorst after neighbors reported intruders inside a flat across the hall. Officers encountered three men wielding tools attempting to leave via the stairway and engaged them in a scuffle. 43 year old officer Wolfgang Sch. fired a shot in what he described as "self-defense", hitting one of the burglars, a Dutch national, in the back. The wounded man was able to jump out of a window on the first floor a few meters off the ground and run about 50 meters before collapsing from blood loss. After six separate trials, the officer was given 8 months probation in 2008.

== 2003 ==
Date (YYYY-MM-DD)	Name	Age	Place	State	Summary of events
2003-05-04	N.N.	31	Saarlouis	Saarland	A burglar was caught during a break-in at an electronics store and attempted to escape by car. When his car was stopped at A620 during a routine traffic stop, the burglar opened fire on police, heavily injuring one officer. He was subsequently shot himself and died at the scene.
2003-05-22	Sch., Steffen	14	Vöhl	Hessen	51-year old Kripo officer Edmund Sch. killed his wife and two sons with his service pistol, before killing himself. The bodies of the sons were found seated at a table set for breakfast while the husband and wife were lying in the hall. A found suicide note revealed, that Sch. was suffering from depression and fear about the future.
2003-05-22	Sch., Dominik	19	Vöhl	Hessen	51-year old Kripo officer Edmund Sch. killed his wife and two sons with his service pistol, before killing himself. The bodies of the sons were found seated at a table set for breakfast while the husband and wife were lying in the hall. A found suicide note revealed, that Sch. was suffering from depression and fear about the future.
2003-05-22	Sch., Waltraud	48	Vöhl	Hessen	51-year old Kripo officer Edmund Sch. killed his wife and two sons with his service pistol, before killing himself. The bodies of the sons were found seated at a table set for breakfast while the husband and wife were lying in the hall. A found suicide note revealed, that Sch. was suffering from depression and fear about the future.
2003-09-24	O., Oliver	40	Wedemark	Niedersachsen	Following an argument with his wife, a man purposely crashed his car into a tree in Mellendorf. When a passerby tried to check up on him, the man, standing at 1,98 meter and weighing over 100 kilograms, beat, bit, and choked her, nearly severing a finger before her dog fended him off. He then began damaging nearby parked cars while shouting nonsensical phrases. When people at a house party confronted the man about the disturbance, he rushed into the house, beating several more people and using a bottle to hit a car. When a passing police car stopped to check on the situation, the man bludgeoned one officer's head with his bare hands and grabbed his heavy-duty flashlight as a makeshift weapon while the other officer retreated to call for backup. Having put around 100 meter distance between himself and the attacker, the injured officer fired a warning shot before shooting the man in the knee, to no effect, as the man continued advancing towards him, shouting "Du kannst mir gar nichts, ich bin nämlich unsterblich" ("You can't harm me, for I am invincible"). The 37-year old officer fired another four shots, hitting him in the abdomen, but even so, the man was able to make a dash into the open police car, apparently to attempt escape. The officers were able to lock him inside, with the man breaking a window and attempting to crawl out before being restrained. He was subsequently brought to a hospital, but did not receive treatment as he kept attacking the doctors, dying from his injuries hours later.
2003-12-11	N.N.	32	Rheurdt	Nordrhein-Westfalen	Police were called by a neighbour after she had dispute with the man in the apartment next door. The man turned out to be a known drug addict with psychosis and first refused to let officers in before attacking them with a knife. The officers fired ten shots at the man, with eight of those hitting him, with two shots in the chest and one in the head being determined to have caused his death.

== 2004 ==
Date (YYYY-MM-DD)	Name	Age	Place	State	Summary of events
2004-01-27	N.N.	22	Frankfurt am Main	Hessen	Two men opened fire from their car during a routine documents check by police in Nordend-West at a checkpoint to A66. A 27-year-old officer was hit in the shoulder and in the shootout, the driver was killed while the passenger was heavily injured and died at a hospital. Large amounts of money were found inside the vehicle. The driver had a prior record for drug and theft offenses and it's suspected that both men had robbed a beverage store shortly before the traffic check.
2004-01-27	N.N.	31	Frankfurt am Main	Hessen	Two men opened fire from their car during a routine documents check by police in Nordend-West at a checkpoint to A66. A 27-year-old officer was hit in the shoulder and in the shootout, the driver was killed while the passenger was heavily injured and died at a hospital. Large amounts of money were found inside the vehicle. The driver had a prior record for drug and theft offenses and it's suspected that both men had robbed a beverage store shortly before the traffic check.
2004-02-03	S., Alexander	32	Köln	Nordrhein-Westfalen	Three SEK officers were practising how to overpower offenders during a training exercise at a barracks in Rodenkirchen when an officer's gun went off and killed one of them. The officer who discharged the shot had been carrying a loaded weapon against regulations for unknown reasons and was sentenced to eight months probation. Seven more officers were suspended and the SEK unit they were a part of was disbanded.
2004-02-05	N.N.	36	Düren	Nordrhein-Westfalen	Two police officers accompanied city officials to an apartment for the transport of a man to a psychiatric clinic. Police broke open the lock after they were denied entry, at which point the man fired several shots from a gun at the group. The officers fired back before retreating, with SEK later finding the man dead from a single shot. His weapon was identified as a gas pistol, with other firearms being found at the scene.
2004-03-01	N.N.	35	Schweinfurt	Bayern	A woman requested police to fetch her as she was afraid of her life partner. When two officers, both aged 47, arrived, the partner, who was sitting drunk on the ground of the living room, pointed a gun at them. Both officers ducked for cover and made repeated commands to drop the weapon while the man stood up and walked towards both officers. Officer Mike Muche fled while officer Gustav Pohli remained and fired a shot at the man during a disarming attempt. Because Pohli fell to the ground due to recoil, Muche believed the man had shot his colleague, and went back inside. Because the man still aimed his gun at the officer, he fired five shots at the suspect, fatally striking him three times in the stomach. The man died at a hospital the next day and the weapon was discovered to be a gas pistol. An investigation revealed that the man had faked the threat against his girlfriend to get police to the scene, intent on having an officer shoot him in a suicide by cop. The second officer later found out that the deceased was the brother of a close friend.
2004-04-30	N.N.	35	Göppingen	Baden-Württemberg	A resident caught a tire slasher in the act and was immediately threatened. The resident then called police, who attempted to calm the knifeman down, but were forced to use deadly force when he did not put away his weapon.
2004-06-02	N.N.	62	Schöneck	Hessen	A bank robber who had stolen 20,000 euro at gunpoint was spotted by a police patrol and opened fire on the officers. Returning fire fatally hit the robber in the chest.
2004-09-23	Taş, Ersin	21	Neuss	Nordrhein-Westfalen	A Turkish man beat and kidnapped his 21-year-old Moroccan former girlfriend at knifepoint over an ongoing custody battle over their four month old child. Due to his car not starting, he retreated to a garage and made demands to police for his infant son, cocaine, pizza, alcohol and a taxi, or else he would cut off his hostage's fingers, also dousing her in gasoline and threatening to kill her and himself. He was shot by SEK during the rescue operation in which 100 officers were involved. The hostage was secured with minor lacerations. During their relationship, the man had held his girlfriend hostage in their home until she fled and found refuge at a women's shelter from where he later abducted her.
2004-09-27	N.N.	77	Gießen	Hessen	A tenant attempted to prevent his eviction by locking himself in his apartment and alternately threatening to shoot the bailiff or to kill himself for three hours. SEK raided the location, leading to a shootout during which one shot was fired by the tenant while two shots were fired by officers, killing the man.
2004-11-25	N.N.	42	Ratingen	Nordrhein-Westfalen	Two armed men disguised in St. Nicholas outfits robbed 140 000 euro from a Sparkasse bank in Lintorf. Two police officers saw the robbery occurring and attempted to arrest the robbers once they stepped outside, but in the ensuing firefight, one of the robbers was killed while a 37-year-old officer was critically injured. The 43-year-old accomplice managed to escape in a car driven by his girlfriend, who took him to a hospital, where both were then arrested. The deceased had been previously convicted of murder.
2004-12-27	Condé, Laye-Alama	35	Bremen	Bremen	Police officers arrested a Sierra Leonean asylum seeker in Viertel because they assumed he was selling drugs. Since officers believed he had swallowed cocaine pellets to hide evidence, the man was brought to a police station where a doctor applied an emetic forcefully through a stomach tube. He was physically restrained during this process, which was repeated unsuccessfully several times, during which the man inhaled vomit and suffered a lack of oxygen. He went comatose, but left alone for around 15 minutes, as personnel assumed he was feigning injury, only receiving hospital treatment two hours later. The man died from cerebral hypoxia on 7 January 2005 without regaining consciousness. Five cocaine pellets were recovered from his stomach during the autopsy. The attending doctor was tried for negligent homicide, but found not guilty in 2011, ruling that the primary cause of death was a heart defect.

== 2005 ==
Date (YYYY-MM-DD)	Name	Age	Place	State	Summary of events
2005-01-07	Jalloh, Oury	37	Dessau	Saxony-Anhalt	Oury Jalloh, a Guinea-born Sierra Leonean refugee, was arrested for harassment after repeatedly asking a woman on the street for her phone. He had refused to provide documentation and when he resisted being put into a squad car, two officers, Hans-Ulrich M. and Udo S., bound him in hand and foot restraints. Jalloh spent 2 1/2 hours in a holding cell, handcuffed by both his hands and feet to a mattress. A policewoman who spoke to Jalloh over the intercom in an attempt to calm the swearing man down, later stated that she heard "splashing" and sounds that led her to believe one or more people were in the same room as him. A fire then broke out in his cell, which was discovered ten minutes after it had erupted; a fire alarm went off, but was initially turned off twice without further action by a superior officer, Andreas M. Jalloh lived for a few minutes after the fire was extinguished before passing out and dying. An autopsy showed that he had died from an intense heat stroke and that there was alcohol, cannabis, and cocaine in his system. A court concluded that based on police testimony that despite having been tied up and searched, Jalloh had, in a timeframe of 20 minutes, doused the cell as well as the fire-resistant mattress in a flammable liquid (2 to 5 liters to account for the 4th-degree burns according to the court) and set himself ablaze with a lighter in his pocket that was not found during the initial search and first presented during the trial as evidence in a completely charred state. Another examination of his skeletal remains in 2019 found that signs that Jalloh had been severely beaten shortly before his death, as evidenced by a brittle septum, a broken rib, a torn eardrum and fractures to the nose and roof of the skull. The station chief was fined 10,800 euro in daily payments of 90 euro for negligent homicide. The case caused national and international outrage. The circumstances and their investigation, which were fully ceased in 2018, are still contested. Another man, Mario Bichtemann, had died in the same cell three years earlier from a skull fracture.
2005-02-03	N.N.	34	Karlskron	Bayern	Police were trying to stop a car with a broken headlight, but the vehicle sped off. The car got stuck after crashing into a fence when it swerved to avoid a road block and during the arrest, the man, who had a warrant for fraud, was fatally shot by officers.
2005-02-11	N.N.	43	Bielefeld	Nordrhein-Westfalen	A Moroccan informant was meeting with two police officers at a fast food restaurant when he suddenly attempted to attack with a knife. One of the officers shot the informant in the chest; he later died at a hospital.
2005-04-05	F., Jens	34	Rudolstadt	Thüringen	A man shot two acquaintances after an argument with his girlfriend over a custody dispute over their one-year-old son, killing a 35-year old man and injuring a 32-year old man. He then attempted to ram arriving police with the car that still contained his girlfriend and son. While one officer is injured, two others fired 16 shots on the car, fatally striking the driver in the neck, lightly injuring the girlfriend and leaving the baby unharmed.
2005-04-13	N.N.	18	Lübeck	Schleswig-Holstein	A 44-year-old man fled to a neighbour's apartment in St. Lorenz after his son injured him with a knife in an argument. The neighbour called police to deal with the youth, who attacked both officers with two knives as soon as they entered through the door. He was shot in the stomach and died at the scene.
2005-05-06	N.N.	45	Großenhain	Sachsen	A 71-year-old man was being threatened by his son with two knives. Officers were rushed shortly after they entered the apartment and were forced to fire at least to fatal shots on the attacker.

== 2006 ==
Date (YYYY-MM-DD)	Name	Age	Place	State	Summary of events
2006-02-08	D., Thomas	41	Bad Friedrichshall	Baden-Württemberg	53-year-old police officer Franz K. fatally shot his wife and her lover 17 times with his sidearm. The wife had told her husband about the affair with the house guest when informing him about her intention to divorce, after which the officer left the residence for a day. The officer returned in the night, drunk and armed with his service weapon, and ordered the other man to leave. The argument ended with the officer killing the man, as well as his wife who had thrown herself before her lover. The shooter and a neighbour separately alerted police, with the former barricading himself inside and threatening suicide. After six hours of negotiations, the officer surrendered to arrest.
2006-02-08	K., Elke	35	Bad Friedrichshall	Baden-Württemberg	
2006-04-14	Koumadio, Dominique	23	Dortmund	Nordrhein-Westfalen	A Congolese asylum seeker was shot in the heart by a police officer from a distance of a few metres after threatening a kiosk employee in Eving with a butcher's knife and attacking a police car. According to witnesses, the man, who had been living in Germany since he was 14, had been arguing with the well-acquainted employee when he produced the knife. Human rights groups were outraged and claimed that despite the circumstances that his death was partially motivated or at least compounded by his skin color, also questioning the distance at which he was shot and the placement of the bullets.
2006-05-06	N.N.	41	Lage	Nordrhein-Westfalen	Police were called to the scene of a nightly noise complaint. Officers encountered a man wielding a gun in the courtyard of the building and fired at him. The gun was found to be a gas pistol.
2006-05-10	N.N.	30	Hanau	Hessen	A Moroccan bank robber ditched his loot and attempted escape on a stolen moped. He ran over a police officer who tried to stop him, suffering heavy injuries, before the officer's colleague shot the robber in the back, piercing his lungs. The robber subsequently choked on his own blood.
2006-08-06	N.N.	28	Gersfeld	Hessen	MEK were storming the apartment of a Russian German man wanted for being part of an armed robbery, after he and two other Russian nationals robbed a 26-year-old Ukrainian immigrant of 11,500 euro during the test drive of a car he sought to buy from them at gunpoint. They were greeted by a gun through the door, at which point one officer fired two shots, hitting the gunman in the chest and aorta, causing his death.
2006-08-06	N.N.	55	Fürth	Hessen	A man responsible for a noise complaint at a construction site was found swinging around an axe. Police ordered him to put the weapon down and was subsequently shot at least four times by a female officer, two grazing shots and two that hit the man in the lungs and aorta, killing him. It was reported that the man had been retired after being left with slight mental disabilities following a work accident and that he had apparently been attempting to build a house at the site by himself, leading to several run-ins with the law, though no physical incidents were known to either police or family.
2006-12-01	N.N.	36	Zell am Main	Bayern	A mentally ill man was breaking the windshields of several parked cars with an iron bar at the Oberzell Abbey. He was briefly confronted by the 45-year-old technical director of the monastery, but he retreated after being hit. Two other men, the custodian and a 71-year-old parishioner delivering Christmas cookies for the nuns, saw this and intervened as well. The parishioner managed to strike the attacker in the head with a shovel before tripping and being severely beaten with a hammer by him, causing life-threatening injuries to his skull. Arriving police peppersprayed the attacker to no effect and after repeated warnings to stop his assault, a 27-year-old officer fired two shots when he saw him lifting his arm to beat one of the injured men on the ground. The attacker died in a hospital. He was identified as a Lebanese citizen and had already been noted for a previous incident in March 2005 when he fractured a woman's skull with a meat tenderizer. In June 2007, the two attacked men were honored with medals by minister president Edmund Stoiber for their civil courage.

== 2007 ==
Date (YYYY-MM-DD)	Name	Age	Place	State	Summary of events
2007-01-30	G., Sven	28	Nauen	Brandenburg	24 year old Berlin police officer Sebastian V. was on his way home when he attempted to arrest three drunk men he had spotted using glass breakers they had stolen from the train cart he was in to destroy the windows of phone booths and bus stops. The vandals fled, but two of them came back to threaten the officer when he called for backup. The call recorded as the officer yelled warnings at the men and fired a warning shot. The officer claimed one tried to lunge at him, at which point he fired three shots that fatally hit the attacker in vital arteries in the head and thigh. The other two vandals, aged 20 and 24, gave themselves up without resistance. A criminal charge was considered, as there was no indication that he had acted in self-defense, but it did not go to court.
2007-04-18	P., Natalie	29	Altlußheim	Baden-Württemberg	35-year-old Hockenheim police officer Karsten K. killed his ex-girlfriend with his service pistol. K. broke through the front door of her apartment and shot the woman in the head as she was lying in the bathtub. He subsequently turned himself in at his police station. K. claimed that he acted in rage because the deceased had emotionally and physically abused him during their relationship, and that she had threatened to keep harassing him the day of the shooting. The deceased had retracted a rape accusation hours before her death. The officer was sentenced to life imprisonment for murder in 2008.
2007-05-14	N.N.	35	Hagen	Nordrhein-Westfalen	A French national was checked into a hospital for psychosis by three police officers, who had staff administer sedatives and then tied his arms, legs and chin down. He lost consciousness hours later and suffered brain death due to cardiac arrest while the officers were present. His death only became public knowledge a year later after a similar death in police custody in March 2008. Police did not specify the reason or manner in which the man was tied down and also never explained why the foreign citizen was in their custody.
2007-06-15	N.N.	19	Speyer	Rheinland-Pfalz	A motorist without a driver's license and two passengers were being pursued by a police car after taking off during a traffic check for reckless driving. The vehicle stopped in the middle of the road and when an officer walked up to the car, it backed up without warning, pinning him against his own cruiser. Another officer then shot at the car's tires, then at the driver's side, striking the driver, a Russian national, with two deadly shots.
2007-06-26	C., Tibor Istvan	27	Hamburg	Hamburg	After seven plainclothed police officers stopped the car of two suspected ATM robbers they had been observing near the Hamburg City Hall, 50 year old officer Hans-Peter A. approached the vehicle with his gun drawn. A shot then discharged from the weapon and struck the driver in the shoulder, who was able to step out of the vehicle and ask "You shot me, why did you shot [sic] me?" before collapsing and dying at the scene; the projectile had ricocheted and pierced several vital organs. The men, both Romanian nationals, were found to have fraudulently obtained 3600 euro with credit cards under other people's names. Lawyers representing the deceased's minor children, who were British nationals, sued the officer for damages. The officer was suspended and faced involuntary manslaughter charges. He was cleared of all charges in 2009, but retried in 2010 due to new evidence.
2007-07-01	N.N.	23	Bonn	Nordrhein-Westfalen	Two police officers were searching the outside of St. Paulus Church in Beuel for two burglars who had robbed a nearby computer shop when one jumped from his hiding place in a bush and beat a female officer with a baton. Her colleague then shot him, leaving him with injuries that lead to his death at a hospital. The deceased's 19-year old accomplice was arrested without incident.
2007-07-27	Özdal, Murat	37	Eichstätt	Bayern	Police were called by a Turkish resident who stated that the former partner of his girlfriend had broken into his apartment and was threatening them with a butterfly knife. The intruder. also a Turk, attacked police upon arrival and was fatally shot in the chest.
2007-08-09	H., Sebastian	22	Berlin	Berlin	A mugger who robbed a 21-year-old tourist in Neukölln was caught by two police officers. The mugger was shot twice in the chest when he aimed a defective gas pistol at the officers. A background check of the deceased revealed that he was a former Bundeswehr soldier with a history of alcohol abuse and served in the Afghanistan War between 2003 and 2004. It was noted that he had twice attempted suicide by slitting his wrists, which was attributed to suspected PTSD from his time in Afghanistan, with him telling friends and psychologists that he had nightmares of mutilated bodies and a young girl that bled to death in his arms while stationed in Kabul. His final text messages showed that he had again intended to take his life, which, combined with the non-functional weapon and meager loot (a keychain, a pack of cigarettes, and an empty purse), led investigators to believe that he instigated the crime to commit suicide by cop.
2007-08-22	N.N.	35	Worms	Rheinland-Pfalz	Police responded to a call from a neighbour about a man threatening his 35-year old wife with a knife in their apartment. The man then got into a fight with one of the arriving officers, who shot him in the chest when he felt threatened.
2007-09-25	N.N.	30	Bückeburg	Niedersachsen	After a motorist didn't pay at a gas station in Cammer, a check of his licence plate showed that the car he was driving had been reported as stolen. The motorist crashed after a lengthy car chase, but when officers approached the wreck, the occupant suddenly jumped out with a gun in his hands, forcing officers to fire three shots, with one in the chest killing him instantly.
2007-09-30	N.N.	25	Plauen	Sachsen	A man called police to announce his intent to "throw out" his wife and child and then kill himself with a gun; it is unclear whether he meant that he would expel them from the apartment or defenestrate them. A 40-year old police officer shot the man after he pointed at them with a gun, which was found to be a gas pistol.
2007-10-02	N.N.	33	Löhne	Nordrhein-Westfalen	A patient at a psychiatric facility was behaving aggressively and refusing to take his medication. When SEK attempted to overpower the patient, he attacked officers with a knife. He was fatally shot after taser usage failed.
2007-11-02	N.N.	48	Düsseldorf	Nordrhein-Westfalen	A 52-year-old federal police officer fatally shot his wife with his service weapon in their flat in Angermund before killing himself.
2007-11-26	N.N.	37	Brake	Niedersachsen	Police were called over a man threatening his wife and two of their children inside their house. Officers were immediately attacked by the man when he rushed them at the stairwell with a knife. When he did not react to pepper spray, the man was shot four times in the chest, shoulder and neck, dying of blood loss in the front garden.
2007-12-02	B., Jürgen	52	Neumünster	Schleswig-Holstein	47-year old police officer Jörg L. killed his ex-wife and her new partner with his service pistol. He killed himself in Kiel several hours later.
2007-12-02	L., Marita	44	Neumünster	Schleswig-Holstein	47-year old police officer Jörg L. killed his ex-wife and her new partner with his service pistol. He killed himself in Kiel several hours later.
2007-12-24	N.N.	66	Heppenheim	Hessen	Police officers were called by the family of a man who had made suicide statements. He barricaded himself in his kitchen when officers came and threatened to jump out the window. After the man said he would go on a killing spree, SEK broke through the door and were attacked by the man wielding two knives. A taser was first tried, but when it malfunctioned, another officer fatally shot the man.

== 2008 ==
Date (YYYY-MM-DD)	Name	Age	Place	State	Summary of events
2008-03-11	N.N.	43	Ratingen	Nordrhein-Westfalen	A mentally ill man with persecutory delusions forcefully entered a neighbouring flat and took a 76-year old woman and her 57-year old son hostage for four hours. When police arrived, the man attacked a 32-year old officer with two kitchen knives, causing his 33-year old colleague to fire three shots, killing the man who died at the scene shortly after.
2008-02-17	Özdamar, Adem	26	Hagen	Nordrhein-Westfalen	A man called police while suffering from cocaine-induced paranoia and asked to be brought to the station for safety, where he began acting out. Officers used pepper spray, handcuffed him and put him in a prone position on the floor for 15 minutes as they waited for an ambulance to take the man to a hospital. The arriving doctor found that he was no longer breathing and after police removed the man's bindings, taking several minutes to do so, she was able to resuscitate him for transport. The man died at a hospital on 5 March after spending a month in a coma. His death was attributed to fluid build-up in his brain.
2008-03-13	Carmack, Jeremiah Wade	30	Altershausen	Bayern	An American soldier stationed at the U.S. Army Heidelberg Garrison broke into the apartment of his ex-girlfriend in Königsberg, tied her up and threatened her with a M4 carbine. After she escaped and alerted a SEK unit, the soldier fled, but was tracked down to a nearby field via thermal camera. The soldier was shot twice after he pointed his rifle at SEK who had been ordering him in English to drop it. He later died at a hospital.
2008-05-21	M., Sultan	24	Hamburg	Hamburg	A resident in Billstedt called police because the Afghan couple next door was arguing loudly. As police arrived, the 30-year old wife barged out of the apartment to escape her husband, who was wielding a gun. The husband opened fire, hitting his wife in the stomach and shoulder, as well as grazing two officers in the neck and leg respectively; all three survived. One officer shot back as the husband retreated. MEK later found him dead from the wound in a stairwell, though it was initially claimed that he died from two self-inflicted gunshots to the head before rescinding their statement. The husband was found to have been a domestic abuser, having frequently beaten his wife, once even at her workplace at a cosmetics shop, and planted a listening device in her phone.
2008-05-25	N.N.	53	Bayreuth	Bayern	A schizophrenic man from Berlin was spotted by two police officers fiddling around with a parked bicycle. Officers called out to the man, who fled, pulled out a gun and began firing at them, heavily injuring one officer. The other then shot the man, five times in the chest and once in the buttocks. The man collapsed dead after running a few meters. Police briefly argued that the man had not died from the several shots that pierced his heart, but from a self-inflicted shot in the mouth, which an autopsy did not find. The gun was identified as having been stolen during a 1985 burglary in Itzehoe by the man, who had also been carrying a home-made shotgun.
2008-05-30	N.N.	38	Hamburg	Hamburg	Police responded to a call about a mentally ill man attacking multiple people inside a building in Langenhorn. The man immediately fought with the officers, beating several of them severely before he wrestled a gun from a female officer's hands. Another policewoman shot the man when he attempted to flee into an apartment, where he was found dead by MEK.
2008-06-07	N.N.	29	Dattenberg	Rheinland-Pfalz	Police were sent to prevent a man from violating a restraining order filed by his ex-girlfriend when he attempted to enter her apartment. He was able to grab an officer's baton and proceeded to bludgeon him with it until another officer shot him twice, killing him. A search of the man's home uncovered the body of 33 year old acquaintance from Erpel, whom the deceased had brutally beaten and drowned in the bath tub he was found in.
2008-06-24	N.N.	34	Langenhagen	Niedersachsen	A 22-year-old woman called police because her ex-boyfriend was standing in front of her apartment with two knives in his hands and trying to kick down her door. Officers attempts to subdue the attacker with pepper spray were unsuccessfully and when he charged at two arriving officers, the others shot the man three times in the torso; a fourth shot an officer in the foot. The man died at a hospital in Hannover later that day.
2008-11-29	H., Joachim	50	Weißenhorn	Bayern	Police conducted a wellness check at a man's residence after his estranged wife became worried over his prolonged isolation. The man threatened officers with a gun and after a standoff and negotiations lasting several hours, SEK stormed the premises. The man was shot and killed when he opened fire on the unit.
2008-12-08	N.N.	28	Neuwied	Rheinland-Pfalz	A man was to be arrested in his home for suspected drug dealing, assault and unlawfully discharging a firearm. Police found the man in his bed, but upon getting closer he aimed a revolver at the officers, who shot and killed him at the scene.
2008-12-31	J., Dennis	26	Schönfließ	Brandenburg	A petty criminal with a record for crimes including burglary, theft and assault was shot eight times by 34-year-old police officer Reinhard R. during an attempted arrest for not serving a 13-month sentence. Police stated that he was known to carry a knife and pepper spray on him, was under the influence of cocaine and had struck a police officer while fleeing in his car, but an autopsy showed that he had been dead before entering the vehicle. The shooter was given a suspended sentence, the other accusees were sentenced to monetary penalties.

== 2009 ==
Date (YYYY-MM-DD)	Name	Age	Place	State	Summary of events
2009-03-05	B., Sven	24	Hamburg	Hamburg	Police headed to the address of a mentally ill man in St. Pauli who had threatened to kill himself over the phone. Knocking elicited no response and while officers were conversing with floor neighbours, the door was suddenly flung open and the resident charged at police with a 40 cm long blade. He was shot "more than four times" by an officer and died at the scene.
2009-04-30	Eisenberg, Tennessee	24	Regensburg	Bayern	A flatmate of student Tennessee Eisenberg called police about him acting madly and making stabbing motions towards his flatmates. Four police cars showed up, with several officers confronting Eisenberg, who threatened them with a knife. The exact events following have been subject to much scrutiny, as claims by police officers are inconsistent with the nature of the wounds inflicted; it has been established that the fatal shots were fired after Eisenberg had been subdued by warning shots and pepper spray, several shots even hitting him in the back. No officers had to appear in court.
2009-05-23	N.N.	69	Haag in Oberbayern	Bayern	A civilian police car was pursuing a traffic offender on B12, making unlawful overtaking maneuvers and driving over the speed limits themselves, when the police car struck and killed an elderly pedestrian crossing the road.
2009-06-01	N.N.	45	Ahlen	Nordrhein-Westfalen	A 49-year-old police officer killed his girlfriend with several shot from his sidearm before committing suicide. Both of them were married and it is assumed that the officer wanted to avoid the fallout from the affair.
2009-06-25	H., Christian	33	Berlin	Berlin	A patron at a casino at Zoo train station was discovered carrying two different foreign passports (Croatian and Dutch) on him. After the man was brought to the police car, officers were informed via radio that the man was wanted for fraud and armed theft. As the man was being handcuffed, he broke loose, used pepper spray on an officer and grabbed the officer's gun, firing at him, barely missing his head. Another officer then fired twice on the attacker, who died in a hospital after being fatally hit in the torso. He was identified as a Croatian national and was wanted in connection to the 2008 contract killing of millionaire real estate magnate Friedhelm Sodenkamp for supplying the hitman, Polish ex-French Foreign Legion soldier Adam M., with the pistol used in the murder.
2009-11-10	N.N.	48	Frankfurt am Main	Hessen	Police were called when a man was acting violent at the doorstep of his 44 year old ex-wife's apartment in Nieder-Eschbach. He shot at the arriving squad car, heavily injuring an officer, and was killed in the following shootout shortly after.
2009-12-24	N.N.	19	Leimen	Baden-Württemberg	Three masked men robbed a gas station and ran into a random passing police patrol unit. One member of the gang, a man from Ludwigshafen, opened fire with his gas pistol on the police officers and was twice shot in return. His accomplices, aged 19 and 20, fled, but were arrested and admitted to previously robbing several locations in Mannheim.
2009-12-26	P., Dirk	38	Hamburg	Hamburg	A mentally ill man diagnosed with schizoaffective disorder was trashing his apartment in Ohlsdorf and had the police called on him after his mother was unable to call him down. The man, who stood 1,90 m and weighed 130 kilos, attacked officers with a knife after they broke down his front door and when pepper spray did not stop him from advancing, he was shot three times in the torso by a 32-year old officer, bleeding to death within the hour.

== See also ==
- Lists of killings by law enforcement officers
- Use of firearms by police in Germany
- List of killings by law enforcement officers in post-reunification Germany (1990s)
- List of killings by law enforcement officers in post-reunification Germany (2010s)
- List of killings by law enforcement officers in post-reunification Germany (2020s)
