= Killing of Halim Dener =

Kurdish boy killed by German police

Halim Dener
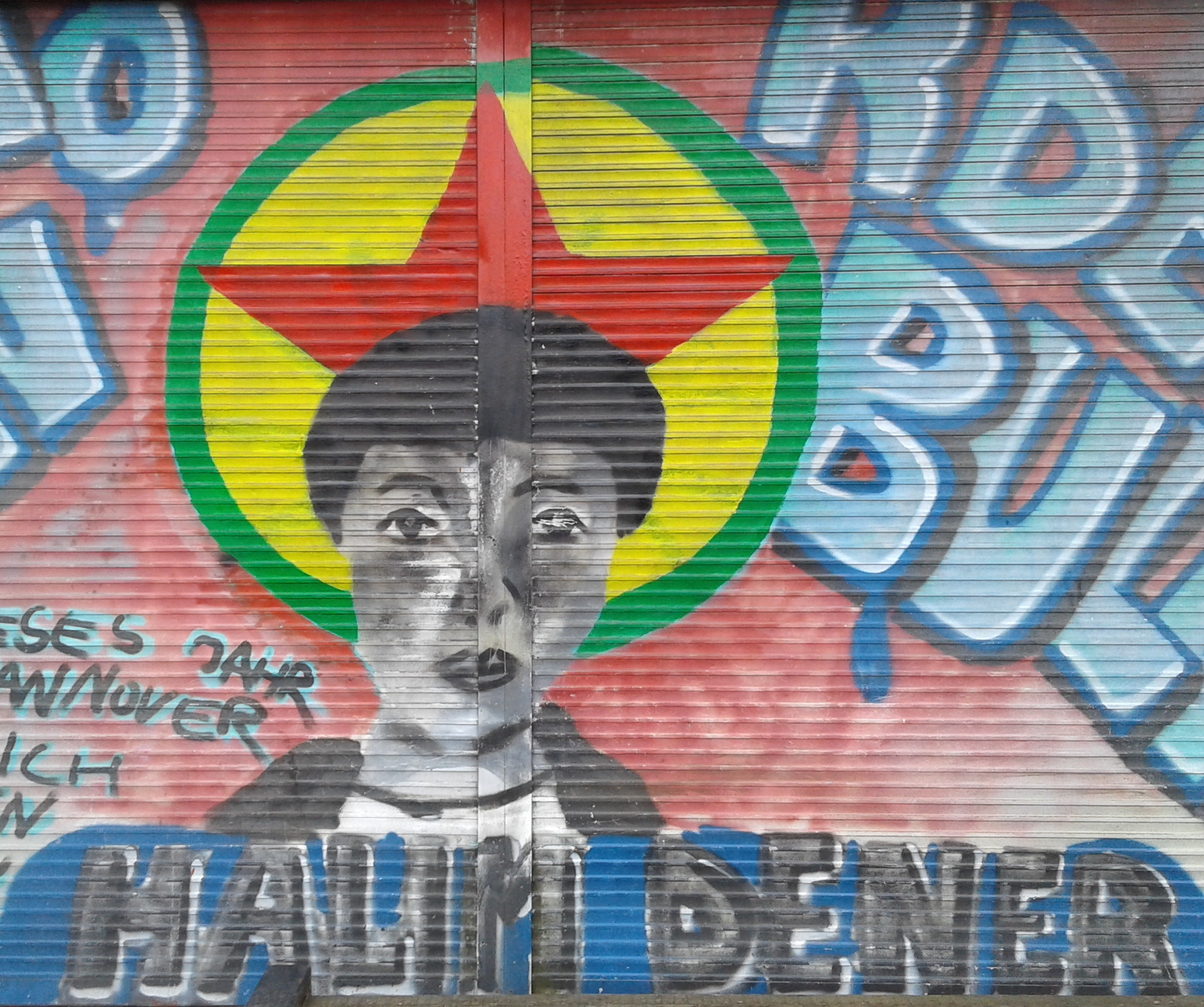
- A memorial to Halim Dener in Bielefeld
- Born: 23 December 1977; Genç, Bingöl Province, Turkey
- Died: 30 June 1994 (aged 16); Hanover, Lower Saxony, Germany
- Cause of death: Shot dead by a police officer

Halim Dener was a 16-year-old Kurdish boy shot dead by a police officer in Hanover, Germany, on 29 June 1994. The Halim Dener Campaign commemorates the anniversary of his death.

== Background ==
Dener was raised in the village of Parçuk near Keklikdere, experiencing the clashes with Turkish authorities who subjected residents to physical abuse, raids, and arbitrary arrest. Dener had been tortured with beatings and falaka in a Turkish military prison and fled his home village before it was destroyed in a tank offensive by the Turkish Armed Forces. At 16, Dener came to Germany as an unaccompanied minor and in early May 1994, he applied for asylum under the name Ayhan Eser. He lived in Neustadt am Rübenberg and integrated into the Kurdish independence movement in Hanover.

== Shooting ==
In the late evening of 29 June, Dener and several other Kurds went out to put up posters for the National Liberation Front of Kurdistan (ERNK), an offshoot of the Kurdistan Workers' Party (PKK). The PKK had recently been banned in Germany as a terrorist group. At around 23:00, Dener was in the central Steintor pedestrian zone when he encountered several SEK officers. According to the account of the police, what happened next was that he tried to run away and they restrained him. There was a scuffle and when a police officer tried to pick up his gun it fired, killing the boy with a gunshot to the back.

== Later events ==
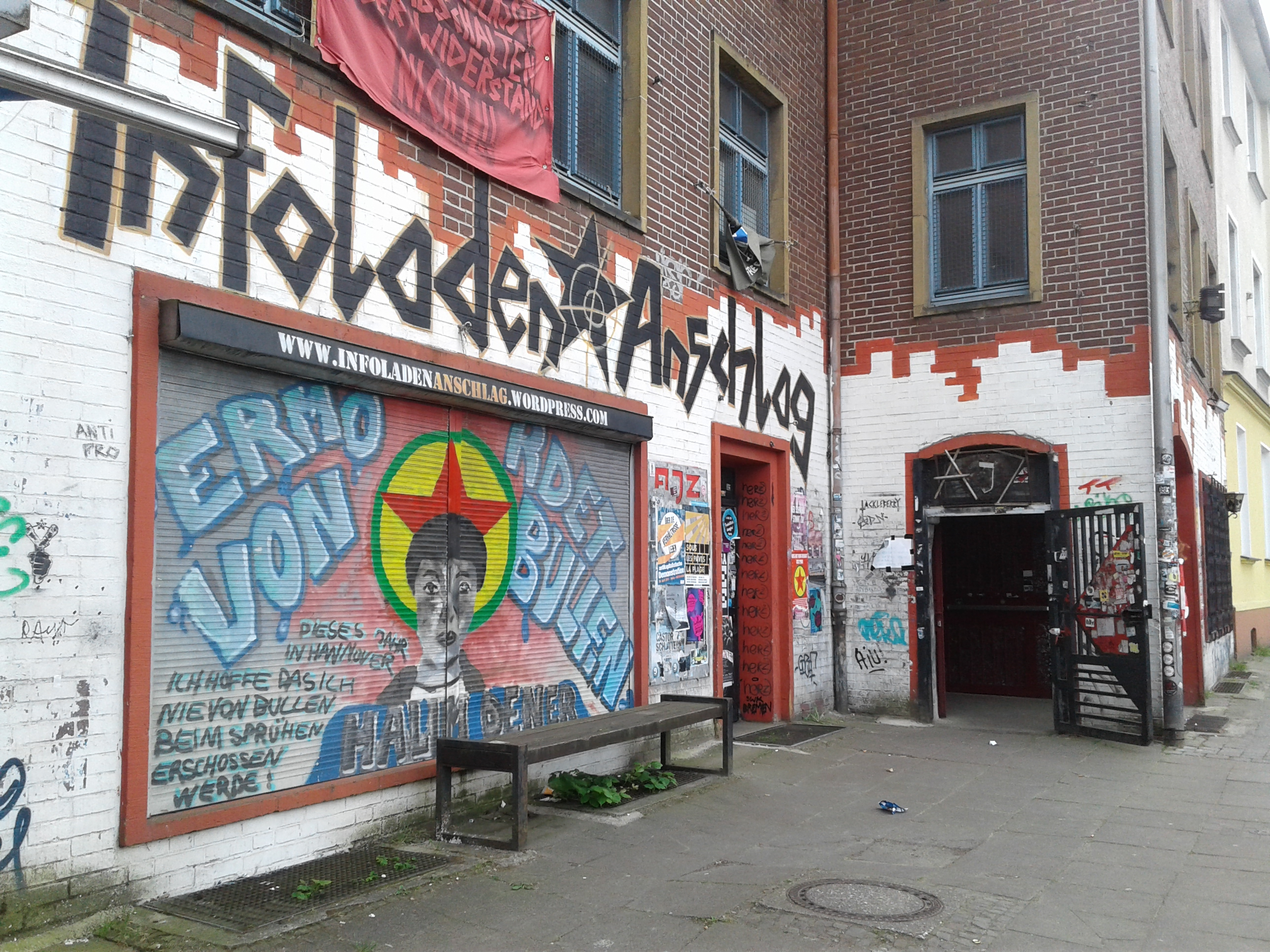
The disputed artwork is at the entrance to a social centre

On the 20th anniversary of Dener's death in 2014, a proposal was made to rename a square after Dener, as a memorial. In the Linden-Limmer district, council members voted to do so, but the plan was then vetoed by the city council. The cancellation of the plan was controversial; one campaigner said "I don't think anyone would arrive at the idea that they wouldn't name a square after victims of fascism because that would upset neo-Nazis". The Halim Dener Campaign continued to press for a memorial to Dener in the city, but Mayor Stefan Schostok resisted, saying he did not want to inflame tensions between Turks and Kurds.

A mural painted to commemorate Dener in 1994 on a social centre in Bielefeld became subject to a three-year legal battle and was eventually declared in 2020 to be a work of art (and therefore not illegal). In 2021, 300 people marched in memory of Dener and to protest recent police raids on a Kurdish social centre. As of 2024, despite the wishes of Hanover's city administration and the Kurdish Community of Germany (KGD), no plans were in place for a memorial plate due to a lack of communication with police and the Turkish community.

== See also ==
- Killing of Rishi Chandrikasing
