= Murder of Yangjie Li =

Murder and rape of Chinese student in Dessau, Germany

- Location: 51.83°N 12.24°E; Dessau, Saxony-Anhalt, Germany
- Date: 11 May 2016 – 12 May 2016; 21:24 – ca. 2:30 (CET)
- Attack type: Homicide, rape, mutilation
- Victims: Yangjie Li, aged 25
- Perpetrators: Sebastian Flech; Xenia Lang
- Motive: Sexual sadism

On 11 May 2016, 25-year-old Chinese architecture student Yangjie Li was abducted, raped, and murdered by 20-year-old Sebastian Flech in Dessau-Roßlau, Saxony-Anhalt, Germany. Li's body was found two days later and on the same day, Flech and his fiancée Xenia Lang were arrested when they approached police with a cover story about potential DNA evidence on Li's body.

In 2017, both were found guilty of the murder. Flech was sentenced to life imprisonment for murder while Lang, who had knowingly lured the victim into an ambush, received a juvenile sentence of 5 years and six months for sexual assault. The accused's parents are police officers, and it was suspected the police may have acted to suppress evidence, as part of a multitude of alleged misconduct by Dessau-Roßlau Police since the 1990s. The event generated substantial media attention in Mainland China.

== Victim ==
Yangjie Li (simplified Chinese: 李洋洁; traditional Chinese: 李洋潔; pinyin: Lǐ Yángjié) was born on 9 September 1990 in Jiaozuo, Henan. She studied at the School of Civil Engineering at the Henan University of Science and Technology and since 2014, Li was a student at the Dessau-Roßlau campus of the Anhalt University of Applied Sciences. At the time of her murder, she was in her final semester for a master's degree.

== Murder ==
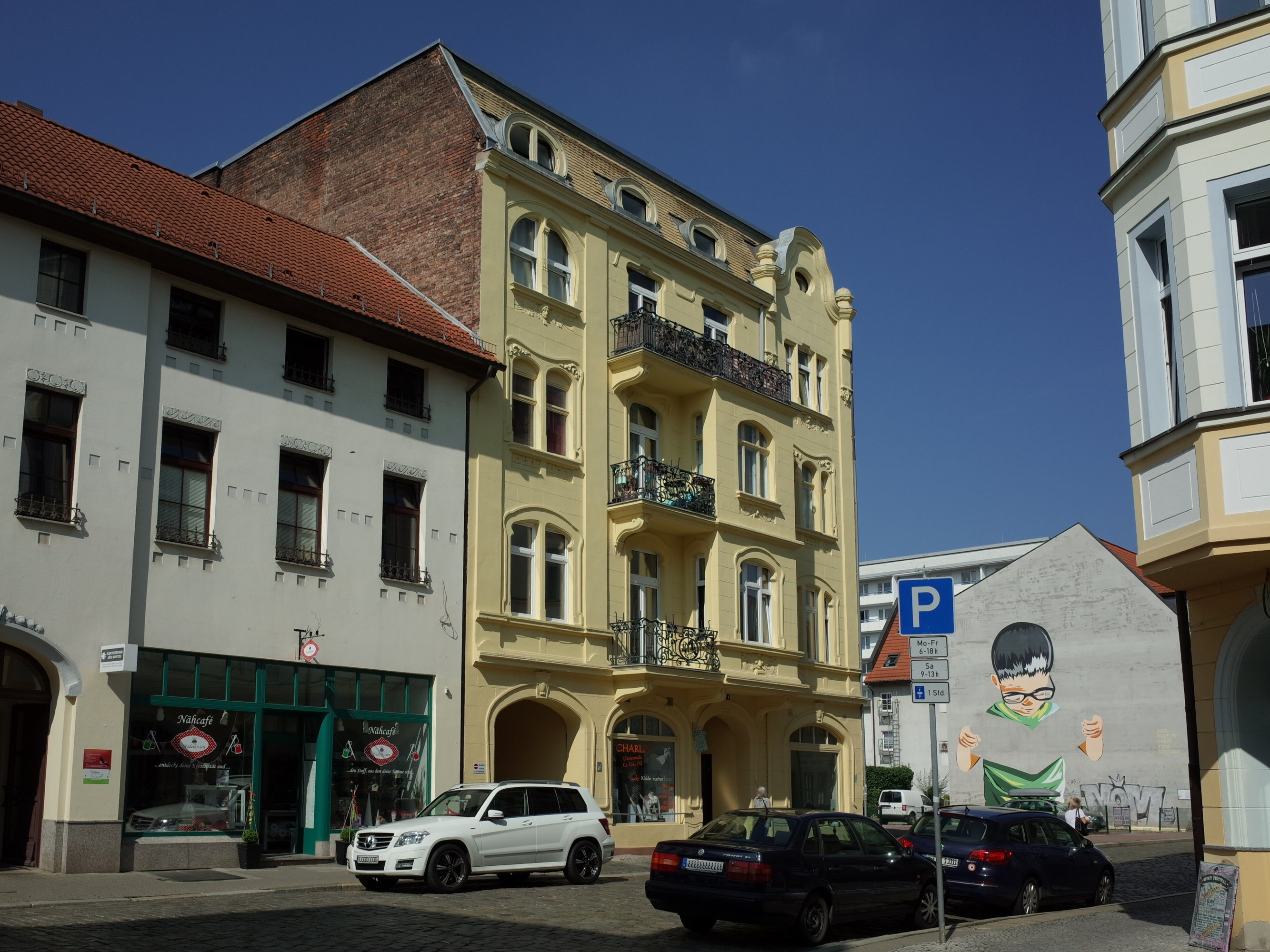
House in Johannisstraße, Dessau-Roßlau

On 11 May, at 20:30, Li left her group home in Johannisstraße 4 in downtown Dessau to go jogging and did not return. She wore black pants, a white-gray shirt, and black sneakers, and followed her usual running route across the city, through Dessau's city park and the museum district.

At 21:24, Li passed by Johannisstraße 7, where she stopped after being addressed by a woman, identified as 20-year-old Xenia Lang. Lang later testified that she had asked Li if she could help her carry something up the staircase to her apartment. The scene was captured on surveillance footage from an adjacent antique store and showed Li, seemingly hesitant to follow the stranger, glancing around the street before accompanying Lang into the building.

Immediately upon entering the foyer, Li was ambushed by Lang's fiancé Sebastian Flech, who forcibly dragged her to an empty room on the first floor. Over the course of three hours, Li was beaten and raped by Flech, with blood stains found sprayed as far as three meters on the walls and ceiling of the flat by investigators. Lang returned to her and Flech's apartment in the floor above during this time to put her two children to bed and would occasionally return downstairs to participate in the assault, which Lang claimed occurred under force from Flech. Li's resistance resulted in some of Lang's hair being torn out. At one point, Lang used Google Translator to question Li about whether she lived alone, if anyone was going to report her as missing, and if she had any sexually transmitted diseases.

The couple initially waited for Li to die inside the room, but after around an hour, at 2:24 on 12 May, Flech and Lang threw Li out of a ground floor window facing the inner yard, from where she was then dragged further from the building. Li was still alive by that point and died a short while later of blood loss. Between the murder and the time of the body's discovery, Flech called his mother, a high-ranking police officer, at least forty times and told her about his crime.

=== Search ===
On the morning of 12 May, police received a missing person report after her disappearance and mobilized hundreds of police officers in the city to search for the student. Meanwhile, many Chinese people posted messages online in social media channels, such as WeChat, about the missing student. Local Chinese also reported the missing student to the Chinese Embassy in Berlin for help.

=== Discovery of the body ===
On Friday, 13 May, the police search focused on the Anhalt Theater and the Friedensplatz area. At around 11:10, a naked female body was found in a bush behind a portable toilet in Hausmannstraße, near Friedensplatz. The area was immediately cordoned off. The body had such severe wounds on the head and face that immediate identification was impossible. Rudolf Lückmann, professor at the Anhalt University of Applied Sciences, later described her condition, saying "Her mouth, along with the face, is brutally smashed off. Her disfigured body is covered with wounds from a hard struggle for survival."

== Investigation ==
On May 16, the forensic medical examination confirmed that the body was the missing student Li. There were fractures to a cervical vertebrae, several of the ribs, and the skull, as well as severe external wounds to the mouth, breasts, and labia. The neck was also extensively bruised from repeated attempts at strangulation. At least one trace of foreign DNA was found on the body. On May 19, the existence of foreign DNA traces was confirmed. Samples were passed on to the Federal Criminal Police Office for comparison but no match was found.

=== Arrest ===
On Monday, May 23, a young local couple, Sebastian Flech, the son and step-son of a senior official of the Federal Police and the Dessau police chief, and his fiancée, Xenia Lang, handed themselves in to police. The two claimed that the DNA found on the body of the victim could have come from them, and that they had met Li the night before her disappearance and had engaged in consensual sex in their apartment building next to the location where the body was found. The two claimed to have not left the apartment after the meeting with Li (which was contradicted by eyewitnesses’ testimonies who said Li had been seen elsewhere during the time of the purported meeting with the two). While the two denied any involvement in the murder, police made a successful DNA match and issued an arrest warrant for the two on suspicion of joint murder.

At a press conference on Tuesday, May 24, following the arrest of the two suspects, the Dessau-Roßlau chief prosecutor Folker Bittmann repeated the version of events given by the two suspects that there had been a meeting with Li for consensual sex, an assertion contradicted by testimony of witnesses. The spread of the suspect's version outraged the parents of the murdered daughter, as well as Chinese students in Dessau and throughout Germany. It was thought to damage the reputation of the victim, her parents and her family in China, and also became a headline in the leading newspapers and social media in China, where the potential for justice in the German legal system was cast into doubt.

The parents of the victim presented a disciplinary complaint against Bittmann; however the Justice Department has so far seen no reason to employ a different prosecutor than Bittmann. Bittmann has also been responsible for the Oury Jalloh case for years. Oury Jalloh was a refugee from Sierra Leone who died in 2005 during a fire in a cell in the Dessau police station. During the course of the investigation, evidence disappeared, traces were erased, and police documents were destroyed.

=== Ramona and Jörg S. ===
Ramona S., the mother of the accused, and her partner, Jörg S., both police officers, came under general suspicion of covering up evidence of the murder in the couple's apartment. The mother, working for the police department Sachsen-Anhalt East, had protected her son previously during several criminal investigations by the local police, which was headed by her husband. Flech had at least forty prior arrests as an adult for crimes including assault, slander, arson, and property damage, but most were dismissed once his parents became involved. Ramona S. volunteered to join the investigating group "Anhalt". The stepfather was the head of the Dessau police station from November 2012 until June 6, 2016, when he was barred from official duties (without disciplinary procedure). Specifically, they allegedly helped the suspects empty the apartment on 21 May, just two days before Flech's arrest. The investigation was therefore transferred from the Dessau police to the police in Halle.

== Reactions ==
On Wednesday, 18 May, 600 Chinese students and many others gathered at the Seminarplatz to take part in a mourning rally. About 150 local people in Dessau, including many students, took part in a memorial night run from the city park in memory of the murdered Li. The citizens of Dessau-Roßlau (population 79,354 as of 31 Dec. 2020)) donated an amount of 4,000 euros to Li Yangjie's family at the end of May 2016 (less than five cents per capita), although this grew to 27,000 euros by August.

== Trial and verdict ==
The murder trial took place from the end of November 2016 until February 2017. Lang told the prosecution that she had only assisted in the murder due to "intense pressure by [Flech] to provide him new sexual satisfaction" and that Flech was sexually excited by inflicting pain on others. The trial also featured the testimony of a former colleague of Flech who alleged that she was raped twice by the main defendant in 2013. Flech's psychiatric history was brought up, including his diagnosis with conduct disorder and ADHD, child-on-child sexual abuse at age seven and his first known sexual assault at the age of thirteen, perpetrated against his half-brother. Despite these known instances, Flech's mother broke off any attempts at therapy for her son. A physician judged Flech as having "an all-around disturbed personality with an equally disturbed sexuality". During the trial, Flech and Lang were also investigated due to the suspicious sudden death of their youngest child in 2015. A subsequent medical examination found that the child had died of natural causes.

On 4 August 2017, the regional court Dessau-Roßlau sentenced Flech to life imprisonment for the murder and rape of Yangjie Li. The court stressed that the aggravating circumstances of the crime would exclude the culprit from the possibility for parole after 15 years in prison. His accomplice, Xenia Lang, was sentenced to five and a half years in prison for sexual assault. In addition, both culprits have to pay a total amount of €60,000 in damages. Immediately after the verdict, the criminal defense lawyer for Flech as well as the parents of the victim announced that they would appeal the verdict. The public prosecutor appealed the verdict. Both appeals were rejected by the Federal Court of Justice in August and September 2018 and the decisions became final.

== See also ==
- List of solved missing person cases: post–2000
