= Dieter Zurwehme =

German fugitive and murderer (1942–2020)

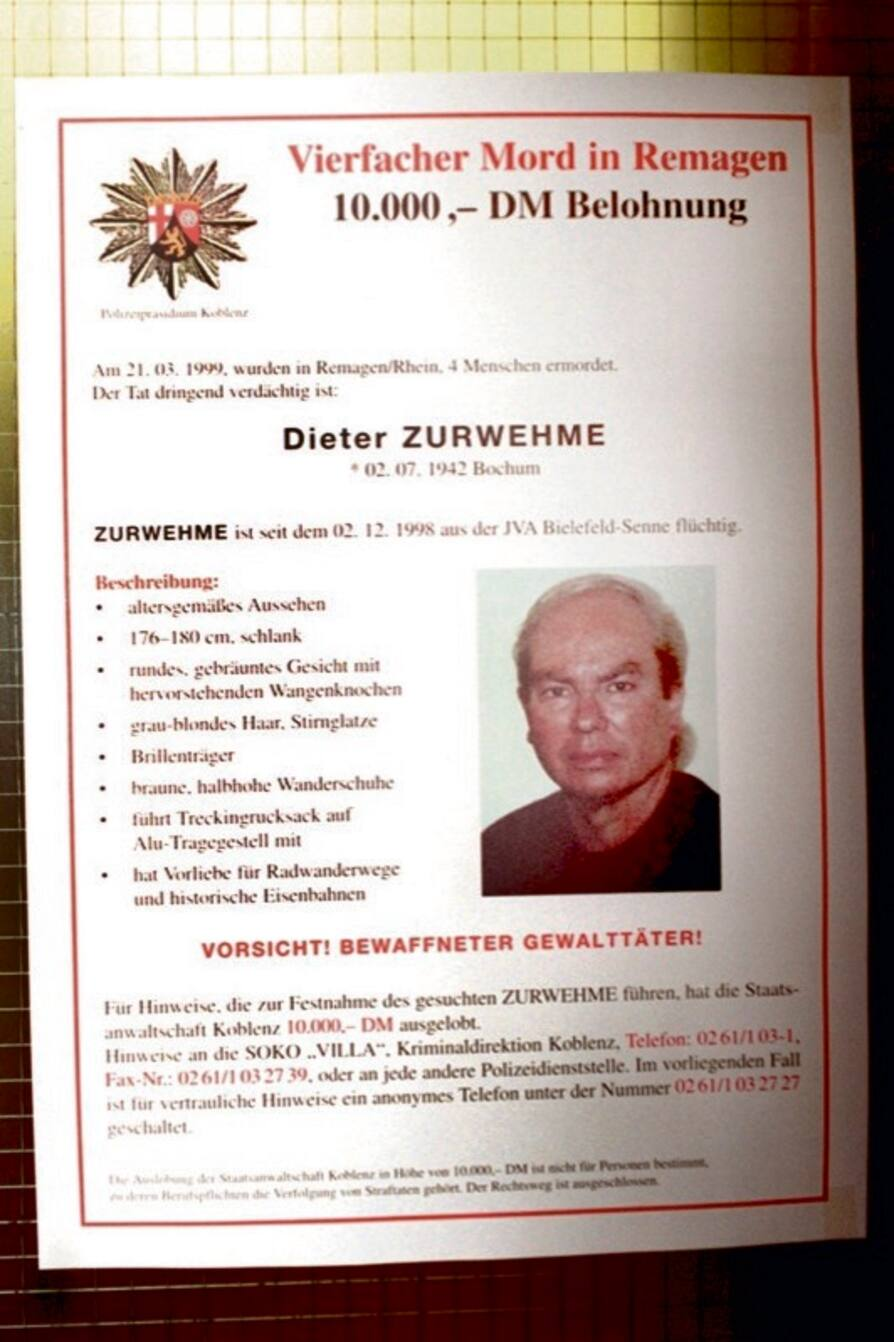
Wanted poster for the capture of Zurwehme

Dieter Zurwehme (2 July 1942 – 2020) was a German fugitive, rapist, and mass murderer. He was responsible for the murder of five people and numerous other serious crimes and gained nationwide attention in the first half of 1999 following a several-month escape from custody. The escapes were followed closely by the media and announced an arrest reward of 10,000 Deutsche Mark.

== Early life ==
Zurwehme was born in Bochum, the son of a German woman and a Polish forced labourer. He was put up for adoption at four weeks old, after the woman's husband realised that the baby was the result of an affair. He grew up with adoptive parents in Ottbergen, a district of Höxter in the Weser Uplands. His father, a Reichsbahn conductor, was reportedly overly strict and forbade his son from playing with other children to keep it quiet in the house.

=== First crimes ===
Zurwehme committed his first criminal act at the age of 12, when he tried to rob a 15-year-old girl using a rock. Passersby interrupted the assault, but Zurwehme was not prosecuted due to being underage. Later in the year, he attacked a 20-year-old woman, beating her severely with a wooden pole before stealing her bicycle. State authorities removed Zurwehme from the custody of his parents and placed him in a government-run reform school. In 1959, aged 16, Zurwehme made his first rape attempt and that same year, he was given his first juvenile sentence for theft and embezzlement, receiving six-to-thirty months to be served at a youth detention center. He escaped and evaded police by sleeping in caverns, gardens and empty vacation homes. Zurwehme was able to cross the border into France and while in Metz, he attempted to enlist in the French Foreign Legion with false documents stating he was 21, but was denied and returned to Germany when the age discrepancy was discovered. He ultimately served nine years in prison and was released at age 26.

== First murder and imprisonment ==
On 16 November 1972, Zurwehme robbed a real estate agency in Düren, where he killed a 51-year-old employee by stabbing her five times in the neck after she screamed for help. While on the run for the murder, he raped a 15-year-old girl near Aachen. Zurwehme was arrested in January 1973 and sentenced in 1974 to life imprisonment for murder. At the same trial, he was also convicted of the 1965 assault and rape of his girlfriend, several other sex and robbery offenses as well as vehicle thefts by the district court of Aachen.

Over the years, Zurwehme was incarcerated at the prisons of Rheinbach, Geldern and Bielefeld. While at JVA Bielefeld-Senne, psychologists saw an apparent change of personality; for example, he learned Latin and French in prison and received prison leaves from 1988 onwards for his good leadership. In February 1990, Zurwehme was arrested while on his 14th furlough in Bergheim, after he attempted to abduct a woman with a gas pistol. A psychologist judged that this incident was simply "mystifying, as human actions occasionally are" and "not an expression of residual criminal energy", recommending no changes to furlough privileges. On 10 September 1996, prison leaves were temporarily revoked after Zurwehme made "concerning statements" during therapy, such as that he thought about raping "attractive women" he saw on the street and often considered not returning to prison. In 1997, he was transferred to an open prison and began working as a restaurant cook during furlough in Bielefeld. On 27 August 1998, Zurwehme's petition for an early release was denied by a judge, who stated that he believed that the defendant was "incapable of [...] recognising, dealing with, and resolving personal conflicts" and was likely to reoffend if released. Despite this, the higher court of Hamm overruled this decision in October and ordered another hearing to be held in December. Later investigations showed that Zurwehme had illegally acquired a number of contraband during his furloughs, including the aforementioned gas pistol, zip-ties, a taser, and a knife.

== Escape, mass murder and manhunt ==
On 2 December 1998, Zurwehme did not return from his 166th clearance. Despite receiving over 1,600 tips from the public over the course of three months, the track was lost quickly and the police investigation was unsuccessful. It's suspected that he spent a portion of this time in Arnhem in the Netherlands. On 20 March 1999, he broke into an empty villa in Remagen and slept there for the night, being discovered the following morning by 71-year-old Kurt Schröder, the owner of the property. Schröder threatened to call police on the intruder and was subsequently attacked and stabbed to death by Zurwehme. When the victim's cellphone rang, Zurwehme answered and told his victim's wife, 59-year-old Maria Schröder, that something had happened to her husband, and that he wanted to tell her everything else in a personal conversation. After the shocked wife had given him her address, he went to her apartment and fatally stabbed Maria Schröder. Her 66-year-old brother Paul Becker, and his 60-year-old wife Rita arrived shortly after and were beaten, tied-up, gagged, and also stabbed numerous times by Zurwehme, who then stole 8000 mark and the Schröders' car. Rita Becker initially survived and was able to gain the attention of neighbours by pushing a television out of the window. Police arrived shortly after and linked the attack to Zurwehme. Rita Becker was brought to a hospital, where she died five days later without regaining consciousness.

Zurwehme continued his escape through Germany, largely by riding night trains, and kept afloat with money from robberies and temporary jobs. In addition, he committed a rape, and fled to several places. The only certain locations were Remagen, Stadthagen, Cuxhaven, Hespe, Frankfurt, Waren, and Greifswald. Credible sightings or suspected hideouts were in Lindau, Calw, Baden-Baden, Freiburg im Breisgau, and Dessau. On 11 May 1999, police suspected Zurwehme in the Allgäu and zeroed in on a potential hiding place in Lindau after a young girl turned in a wallet with forged documents, but the target had left town by this point. Through several determining margins the police investigation was even more difficult. In the weekly program Kripo live on MDR Fernsehen, on the evening of 27 June 1999, the public was called upon to report pertinent observations about complicity, known to be travelling with a walking stick and a backpack.

=== Friedhelm Beate ===
Amongst the numerous callers was a waitress from Heldrungen, who stated that he stayed at a hotel where she worked at day and slept in overnight with a hiking stick and a backpack. At around 23:00, four plainclothed police officers arrived at the business and were led to the room of the hotel guest, 62-year-old Friedhelm Beate from Cologne. A hotel employee asked Beate to come to the door, where he was received by two of the officers with their guns out. Beate reflexively shut the door and held it shut, ending with the officers shooting him dead on the assumption that he was the fugitive. They were unaware of Zurwehme's appearance and conducted the operation in an unlit hallway. The officers were tried, but claimed that the gunshots were fired accidentally. Both were found not guilty in December 1999.

=== Other crimes and sightings ===
On 30 June, a locally known street painter was arrested in Dresden after being mistaken for Zurwehme.

On 21 July in Stadthagen, Zurwehme attempted to rape a 15-year-old girl, but the victim kicked her assailant in the groin, causing severe bleeding. On 25 July, he attacked a 19-year-old woman in Cuxhaven with the same intention, but was scared off by a passerby.

On 27 July, he was tracked to a maize field in Hespe, but escaped a large-scale police operation. Two more high-effort searches, one held by local police between Wunstorf and Barsinghausen and another by state police in Berlin and large swaths of Westphalia, fail to locate any trace of the suspect. In the two following weeks, false reports of Zurwehme reached an all-time high, with reports on 31 July including Berlin, Bochum, Hanover, Cologne, Lehrte und even Mallorca.

On 1 August, another false arrest was made, this time a farmhand in Göttingen. Three days later, another innocent man was held on suspicion of being Zurwehme in Gersfeld. Two days of intense searching in Limburg-Weilburg district ended on 4 August with no concrete leads. Similarly, on 5 August, a search in Achim is cancelled.

On 7 August, multiple callers claimed to have seen Zurwehme in a line bus in Nienburg. On 15 August, Zurwehme robbed a man in his garden in Waren an der Müritz. On 16 August, a rape attempt in Cuxhaven was connected to Zurwehme, but a police search in nearby northern Hamburg yielded no results.

=== Capture ===
On 19 August 1999, a car driver in Greifswald, who only a few days earlier had seen his picture in a television report, saw Zurwehme. The summoned police officers were able to arrest and detain the criminal. When asked about his ID card, Zurwehme recognized his hopelessness and said that: "I am the one you seek". By virtue of four counts of murder, aggravated rape, robbery, rape, coercion and false imprisonment, the district court of Koblenz condemned Zurwehme in June 2000 to life imprisonment with subsequent preventative detention. He remains imprisoned at a prison in Bochum. Due to his notoriety, Zurwehme received at least 15 wedding proposals and in February 15, 2001, Zurwehme married a waitress from the Berlin district of Spandau.

Another fourfold murder of Dutch holidaymakers which occurred in a country house in Southern France during Zurwehme's escape on 22 May 1999, was also initially associated with him. However, a local construction worker was arrested for the crime and this suspicion was later excluded.

In late 2020, Zurwehme died of natural causes at a prison hospital in Fröndenberg, aged 78.

== Press articles ==
- Peter Brock: "The last process" in www.berliner-zeitung.de (Berliner Zeitung). Accessed on February 20, 2010 (in German)
- "The trace is lost and lost again". Spiegel Online. (in German)
- "Zurwehme got married in prison" in www.berliner-zeitung.de (Berliner Zeitung). Accessed on February 20, 2010 (in German)
- Detlef Sieverdingbeck, Thomas van Zütphen: "Trust in a killer" in focus.de (Focus). Accessed on February 20, 2010 (in German)
- "Clearance despite warnings". Spiegel Online. (in German)
