= List of killings by law enforcement officers in post-reunification Germany (2010s) =

Listed below are people killed by non-military law enforcement officers in Germany after reunification in the 2010s, whether or not in the line of duty, irrespective of reason or method. Included, too, are cases where individuals died in police custody due to applied techniques. Inclusion in the list implies neither wrongdoing nor justification on the part of the person killed or the officer involved. The listing simply documents occurrences of deaths and is not complete.

== Statistics ==
Year	Number killed by use of firearms (official statistics)	Number killed by any means (counted)	Number of shots fired on persons
2010	8		40
2011	6		36 (+109)
2012	8		38
2013	8		42
2014	7		51
2015	11	13	41
2016	13		52
2017	16		76
2018	11		58
2019	15	19	62
Sum	103	32	496 (+109)

== 2010 ==
Date (YYYY-MM-DD)	Name	Age	Place	State	Summary of events
2010-01-26	C., Alexander	28	Frankfurt am Main	Hessen	Police responded to a call about a man arguing with a woman in front of a hospital in Nordend. The man had tried to check himself in for psychological treatment for his anxiety and depression, as well as a check-up after he drank six flasks of essential oils, but was denied since the clinic had not mental ward. The ensuing argument between him and his girlfriend, during which he wielded a peeling knife, was then reported by a custodian. Two officers, Michel and Schneider, were reportedly attacked by the man, and fired a total of four shots, with three striking the man in the chest and legs. He collapsed and was subsequently kicked and beaten with a baton by Schneider for "incapacitation for fixation". The man died at the hospital despite immediate treatment. An investigation revealed in December 2010 that video surveillance at the scene had apparently been tampered with, as it was missing several frames essential to the case, as these depicted the confrontation between the officers and the attacker. It was also found that a police radio conversation contained information that contradicted later statements by the same officers and initial reports of the deceased holding a knife before the shooting were disproven following extensive media reports. Furthermore, witnesses stated that officers had kicked the man in the head as he was on the ground, with a medical examination confirming injuries consisting with "head trauma by kicking". The prosecutor's office halted their investigation in November 2011, with the deceased's family lodging a complaint in response. The legal proceedings ended in September 2013.
2010-02-28	Hamade, Slieman	32	Berlin	Berlin	A couple in Schöneberg called police to calm down their son who had become upset at his neighbours for playing loud music. In response to the man's heavy resistance, officers made use of batons and pepper spray. He eventually became unconscious and died at a hospital from circulatory failure, which was ascribed to an allergic reaction due to inhalation of the pepper spray. The death was heavily protested by local leftist groups as the deceased was of Lebanese descent and the police response was seen as discriminatory.
2010-03-15	S., Wladimir	37	Berlin	Berlin	A Russian German man was threatening his 72-year-old mother with a knife in Wedding. She called the police and was able to flee the apartment. The son fled before officers' arrival, but returned two hours later holding an unspecified implement. Officers opened fire as they felt threatened by the unknown object.
2010-05-13	J., Manfred	44	Hennef	Nordrhein-Westfalen	Two police officers were pursuing two men from Mönchengladbach suspected of having started a fight at a night club. The men had been ignoring commands to stop in their tracks and put up their hands when one suddenly turned around, put his hand to a holster on his belt and yelled "Komm her, ich knall euch alle ab!" ("Come here, I'll blow you all away!"). As the officers had been informed by witnesses that one of the men was armed, though without specifying what kind of weapon, he was shot immediately. It was discovered that he had actually been unarmed, with staff members of the club revealing that the man had been previously carrying a retractable baton in the holster and used it to beat someone during the brawl he was involved in; the club bouncers had confiscated the baton just before police arrived. The officer responsible for the shots was cleared of all charges at a trial on 15 April 2011.
2010-06-07	R., Anna	10	Oranienburg	Brandenburg	32-year-old police officer Diana R. killed both her children before killing herself. She strangled her son and daughter in her flat and then hanged herself. Relatives had been unsuccessfully trying to open the apartment door around the time of the killings until firefighters arrived to break it down. Police believe that a custody dispute with her separated husband was the primary motive in the murder-suicide.
2010-06-07	R., Max	5	Oranienburg	Brandenburg	32-year-old police officer Diana R. killed both her children before killing herself. She strangled her son and daughter in her flat and then hanged herself. Relatives had been unsuccessfully trying to open the apartment door around the time of the killings until firefighters arrived to break it down. Police believe that a custody dispute with her separated husband was the primary motive in the murder-suicide.
2010-07-04	N.N.	55	Dolle	Sachsen-Anhalt	A 59-year-old police officer killed his wife through trauma to the head and neck. He then planted her body in his car before intentionally crashing the vehicle into oncoming traffic on a one-way street. Both the officer and the female driver of the other car died through burn injuries after the collision caused a fire.
2010-07-04	N.N.	27	Dolle	Sachsen-Anhalt	A 59-year-old police officer killed his wife through trauma to the head and neck. He then planted her body in his car before intentionally crashing the vehicle into oncoming traffic on a one-way street. Both the officer and the female driver of the other car died through burn injuries after the collision caused a fire.
2010-07-10	N.N.	38	Frankfurt am Main	Hessen	An alcoholic resident at a homeless shelter in Bonames called police, claiming that he was armed and had taken a hostage, whom he would kill unless stopped. Police arriving at the scene quickly discovered that the resident, although armed with a katana, did not have a hostage and openly stated his plan to commit suicide by cop. After a lengthy talk, the man initially agreed to desist and went back inside, but as police were requesting backup for a potential psychiatric case, the man returned and charged at them, forcing the officers to shoot and kill him. His criminal record revealed that he had made a similar attempt in 2006, when he took a 63 year old neighbour in Königstein im Taunus hostage, which ended in him getting shot in the shoulder by SEK.
2010-08-30	L., Engelbert	42	Köln	Nordrhein-Westfalen	After robbing a pharmacy in Merheim, a robber armed with a gas pistol was surrounded by several police officers. It is unclear what exactly occurred, but one warning shot was fired followed by multiple shots directed at the robber who was hit four times in the legs and once in the neck, killing him.
2010-09-19	Radmacher, Sabine	41	Lörrach	Baden-Württemberg	2010 Lörrach hospital shooting: A lawyer killed her husband and son at her apartment, which she then set on fire. She then went to a hospital, where she fatally shot a male nurse. The shooting and fire injured a further 18 people in total, including a police officer. The woman was later killed by SEK, who shot her 17 times. The deceased was a former sports shooter, although she had not been a member of a club since 1998, yet somehow still retained her weapons.
2010-12-10	B., Jaroslav	40	Karlsruhe	Baden-Württemberg	Baden-Württemberg serial bank robberies: After a successful bank robbery at a Volksbank, the so-called "gentlemen robbers" opened fire on the arriving police. During the following shoot-out with the police, a female officer was shot in the thigh while the male robber was killed by the police by multiple shots to the chest. His 38 years old accomplice and wife shot herself after being wounded. The couple, Czech nationals originally from Dubenec, had been committing bank robberies in the state since 1995, striking a total of 21 times and stealing over 2 million euro.
2010-12-30	H., Doris	49	München	Bayern	A mental health clinic informed police that a former patient with psychosis and depression had called them and announced that she would kill her daughter. Firefighters broke open her balcony door at her apartment in Großhadern, after she failed to respond to police, then similarly threatened a 26-year old officer with a kitchen knife, walking towards him and cornering the officer on the balcony. After she did not react to pepper spray and ignored several warnings, the officer shot her once in the chest, dying at the scene from blood loss due to a pierced lung.

== 2011 ==
Date (YYYY-MM-DD)	Name	Age	Place	State	Summary of events
2011-05-19	Omorodion Schwundeck, Christy	39	Frankfurt am Main	Hessen	Christy Schwundeck, a Nigerian-born, German-naturalized woman whose marriage had broken up and who had a history of depression, was rejected monetary assistance in Frankfurt Jobcenter in Gallus and was requested to leave. She refused and the police was called in. Two officers, a 30-year-old male and a 28-year-old female, were confronted by the woman, who injured the male officer with a steak knife. The female officer pointed her service pistol at Christy Schwundeck and, after several verbal warnings and a threatening movement by the suspect towards the officer, the latter shot her. Christy Schwundeck died later in hospital. The case against the female officer has been dropped in spite of a formal request by Christy Schwundeck's relatives to re-open it.
2011-08-24	H., Andrea	53	Berlin	Berlin	A woman failed to show up to a court date for compulsory committal to a psychiatric hospital. When a social worker and two police officers arrived at her apartment in Märkisches Viertel, she refused to leave and injured an officer in the arm with a knife. Backup police forced open the door after which the woman was shot after running at an officer with the knife drawn.
2011-09-07	N.N.	37	Mannheim	Baden-Württemberg	A mentally ill man was scheduled for transport to the district medical office by police. Upon knocking on the man's apartment door in Neckarau, he opened the door and threw a molotov cocktail at a 49-year old officer, heavily injuring him in the face and torso. Officers fired severel shots as they retreated down the stairs and as they left the building, the man threw more molotov cocktails from a window. Police fired another shot at the man from the street, hitting him in the chest, with SEK who breached his apartment later on finding him dead from the gunshot.
2011-09-18	N.N.	31	Mönchengladbach	Nordrhein-Westfalen	A car thief attempted to break into a vehicle parked on the parking lot of a supermarket. A police patrol spotted him in the act and when they approached to arrest him, the thief pulled out a gun and began shooting at the officers. He was shot three times during the subsequent firefight and died at a hospital the same evening.
2011-10-26	N.N.	47	Cuxhaven	Niedersachsen	A homeless man threatened people attending a training event in an administration building, with varying reports of physically assaulting some of them. He was shot by one of the responding officers. The killed person is claimed to have approached the police with an iron bar. The prosecutor dropped the investigations against the 25-year-old police officer.
2011-12-01	K., Joachim	59	Monheim	Nordrhein-Westfalen	When a man was being taken from his apartment to a special care residency, he attacked police officers with a knife. He was hit by bullets and bled to death, before paramedics arrived.

== 2012 ==
Date (YYYY-MM-DD)	Name	Age	Place	State	Summary of events
2012-01-21	R., Lea	8	Saarlouis	Saarland	49-year old police officer Bernd J. killed his daughter with his service pistol, before killing himself. Investigators concluded that he had "meticulously planned" the murder after his wife filed for separation.
2012-02-26	N.N.	57	Maintal	Hessen	A man with known psychological issues was claimed to be loudly yelling while throwing bottles from his flat in Maintal-Bischofsheim onto the street below and causing a disturbance. Police forced entry into the apartment of the man, who is said to have threatened the officers with knives. Police fired several shots, killing the man. The investigation by the prosecutor against the officers was dropped.
2012-04-09	N.N.	25	Karlsruhe	Baden-Württemberg	A police car was responding to a call when it crashed into a taxi, killing a female passenger and injuring six more occupants, three of them critically. The police vehicle only came to a halt after hitting a building. The 23-year-old police officer driving the car was not charged.
2012-05-07	A., Djordjo	47	Aichach	Bayern	A Bosnian man shouted insults at a 22-year-old neighbour while ordering him to remove his car from a parking spot while in his apartment, claiming it was his, despite not owning any vehicle. When the neighbour refused, the man went down to the parking lot with an axe and chased after the neighbour, who was able to flee into the apartment building. The attacker was shot by responding police officers while trying to bash down the door.
2012-07-04	N.N.	43	Wiesloch	Baden-Württemberg	A man randomly tried to attack two young Turkish women outside of a café with a chair and after fleeing, he threatened passerby with a bowie knife. Police officers made an arrest attempt and ordered him to drop the knife while he advanced towards the officers. After a warning shot, police fired at the man from close range, killing him. The deceased was already on record for a number of assaults committed in the preceding months in Wiesloch and Heidelberg.
2012-08-01	Scheffler, Horst	51	Elsfleth	Niedersachsen	Two police officers were called to assist a district worker and a house doctor in bringing a schizophrenic man to a psychiatric institution, after the man's sister called the doctor because her brother was not taking his medication. The officers' presence was requested as she also said that the man had begun carrying a carpenter's hammer on his person. When the group knocked on the door, the man opened, but stated that he would not go with them, claiming that "nothing's wrong". When he caught sight of the police, he pulled out a hammer and lunged at one of the officers, who used pepper spray while running backwards. The other officer, believing the man was going for another strike, fired two shots, hitting him in the groin and chest. Although the shooting was deemed self-defense shortly after, the deceased's family requested a continued investigation into the death. The deceased's twin brother also filed for pain and suffering in 2014 and alleged that contrary to court statements by the attacked officer in 2012, that claimed that a wound to the officer's head was inflicted by the deceased through a hammer blow, that it was instead caused when the officer fell down after the shooting, meaning that there was no harm inflicted on the officer by the deceased and thus no hazardous situation that would have warranted deadly force. It was instead posited that the deceased had aimed for his own legs in an act of self-harm. The shooter also testified that he did not see his colleague being hit in the head. The court dismissed the notion.
2012-09-26	R., Daniel	38	Bitterfeld	Sachsen-Anhalt	A police patrol found a 27-year-old woman bleeding from several stab wounds lying on a street. From her testimony, officers launched a search for her boyfriend whose motorcycle is found parked outside a tattoo studio. The man posted a message on social media announcing his plans to commit suicide and after several hours of observation, the boyfriend rushed out of the building and immediately attacked officers with a machete, heavily injuring one after stabbing him in the head repeatedly. He was then shot twice in the side of the calf and torso by another officer.
2012-10-06	Conrad, André	50	Berlin	Berlin	Two police officers were sent to a beverage shop in Wedding because a drunk man was loitering at the storefront holding a knife and a beer bottle, as well as having an axe in his waistband. The man ignored commands and did not respond to mace or two warning shots. Another shots were fired by both officers, six of which struck the man in the stomach and leg. After the man collapsed to the ground, he was pepper sprayed, beaten with batons and kicks by six officers, as well as bitten in the hand, arm and thigh by a police dog. He fell into a coma and died two weeks later of pulmonary embolism and multiple organ failure. A manslaughter investigation concluded in 2014 that the officers acted in self-defense because the man had still clutched the knife while on the ground. The deceased had been suffering from depression since the death of his son and father in the past four years. Exactly a year earlier, the deceased was arrested for arson after he removed a smoke detector and doused himself and a curtain in ethanol. He made requests to be killed to a paramedic during the arson arrest as well as shortly before the shooting to a cashier.
2012-12-02	N.N.	64	Singen	Baden-Württemberg	Police were sent to serve a warrant at a man's home. The resident was lying drunk on his sofa and began threatening the officers with a revolver, not listening to any commands to put the weapon away. One officer fired two shots, with one fatally striking the man below the neck, with it later being found that the revolver was a gas pistol.
2012-12-07	N.N.	31	Lindenfels	Hessen	A man driving on B47 made several calls to police that he was planning a spree killing. The man's girlfriend separately called in to inform officers that her boyfriend was "losing his mind" after being diagnosed with pancreatic cancer. He was flagged down by police officers, but refused to put down the gun he was holding, even after several warnings were made, and was fatally shot. The gun turned out to be a gas pistol.

== 2013 ==
Date (YYYY-MM-DD)	Name	Age	Place	State	Summary of events
2013-03-18	N., Wolfgang	62	Frankfurt am Main	Hessen	A drunk man got into an argument with neighbours at their apartment building in Gallus, which ended with him stabbing two of them with a knife. He was fatally shot when he tried to attack arriving police officers in the staircase.
2013-05-25	P., Jürgen	49	Geltendorf	Bayern	A suspicious minivan with strange looking markings of German Military Police and a blue emergency beacon on its roof was reported to police by forest workers. As two policemen arrived on the scene, the driver immediately opened fire on the officers which they returned. The attacker was hit deadly by police, a 43-year old officer was wounded by a shot being stopped from his bulletproof vest. Investigations identified the deceased from Türkenfeld as a wanted serial robber known as "Der Waldläufer" ("The Woodland Ranger"), named for his tendency to escape into nearby forest after robberies, that raided several shops and gas stations in Oberbayern since February 2010 during which 5000 euro were stolen in total. The van was found to contain several small-caliber handguns, ammunition, and live handgrenades.
2013-06-07	W., Heinrich	73	Starnberg	Bayern	A retiree entered the lobby of a police station and drew a knife in front of the reception; he then rushed at three officers who were approaching him in the hallway and was shot seven times in return, succumbing to a single gunshot to the head. The deceased was schizophrenic and had a criminal record for civil disorder since the 1980s, including threatening passerby with a machete and writing threatening letters to government officials. He had been released two months earlier from a brief stay at a mental institution and written a letter that read that "there will be a corpse".
2013-06-28	F., Manuel	31	Berlin	Berlin	A recently laid-off accountant and diagnosed schizophrenic assaulted a neighbour after locking himself out of his apartment. Officers did not find him until the next morning, when a security guard reported seeing a man strip off his clothes before climbing naked into the Neptunbrunnen in front of the Rotes Rathaus, brandishing a knife and deeply cutting his throat, torso and arms, while declaring that he was the messiah. Police arrived at the scene to arrest the man, with one officer attempting to convince him to lay down the weapon while another officer, Christian F., entered the fountain on his own accord wielding a baton. The man, standing 1,87 meter and weighing 70 kg, noticed the second officer, turned around and began walking towards him. After he did not follow commands to stop, the officer fired one shot in the chest, killing him. It was found that the deceased had not been using his prescripted medication in his flat, but did have amphetamine, MDA, MDMA, MDE, methamphetamine and THC in his bloodstream. The incident was filmed on phone by witnesses, becoming a viral shock video, and was widely discussed in the press.
2013-07-10	T., Susanne	36	Planegg	Bayern	38-year old police officer Martin S. killed his former life partner with a pistol. He waited for the woman to leave the building she was working in, followed her and shot her six times, before killing himself several minutes later. The pair had been embroiled in a custody dispute over their 5-year old daughter, in which the deceased and her new boyfriend were favored as legal guardians.
2013-08-15	W., Torsten	34	Merching	Bayern	A man texted his former girlfriend that he would come to her house, call the police and have the officers shoot him at her door step. Arriving police found him rampaging around his girlfriend's front door and upon being approached, the man shot at them with a gun. Police fired back, hitting the man who died at the scene.
2013-11-04	Stempniewicz, Wojciech	59	Reichenau	Sachsen	55-year-old LKA police officer Detlev Günzel killed a Polish businessman from Hannover. The pair had met on an online cannibal forum, with the victim agreeing to a "consensual homicide" by acting out a "slaughter house" fantasy for sexual gratification. The men met in a pension owned by Günzel's husband and filmed the murder in a basement prepared for the act. The businessman is presumed to have died from either blood loss and asphyxiation, and was then dismembered. The majority of his remains were buried on the property, with only his genitals missing. Court could not determine whether parts of the victim had actually been consumed, with the defense arguing that the deceased had actually hanged himself before bleeding out, though this was not recorded on video. The officer first received 8 and a half years for murder in 2015, but the court filed revision and sentenced him to life imprisonment in February 2018.
2013-11-12	R., Martin	36	Stuttgart	Baden-Württemberg	A drunk man with psychiatric issues called police at midnight, saying that he would be going out onto the street outside his apartment in Untertürkheim with a pistol, which was later identified as a blank gun. He had previously told acquaintances that he planned to commit suicide by cop. He fired two shots when police officers arrived and ignored all commands as well as a warning shot. An officer shot at the man when he tried to run around a car, which would have led him right to another officer. Although the shot was aimed at the left thigh, it hit the man in the abdomen, leading to his death at a hospital.
2013-12-12	N.N.	27	Hürth	Nordrhein-Westfalen	A mentally ill Kenyan man heavily injured his 32-year-old wife with a machete during a domestic incident. After a verbal command and tear gas failed to subdue the man, a police officer shot him twice when he attacked arriving officers as well.
2013-12-20	Kara, Emrah	29	Holzminden	Lower Saxony	A Turkish man who was diagnosed with schizophrenia had stopped taking his medication and locked himself in his room with a knife. The family contacted their doctor, who in turn called police. The SEK sent in a police dog in hopes that it would disarm or calm the man. After the man stabbed the dog to death, he was shot twice by police.

== 2014 ==
Date (YYYY-MM-DD)	Name	Age	Place	State	Summary of events
2014-03-02	B., Helena	18	Kelheim	Bayern	28-year-old police officer Marcel R. killed his girlfriend with six shots to the head before killing himself. The officer did not have access to his sidearm, which he had handed in after taking leave for prolonged illness, with an investigation revealing that he had stolen the gun used in the killing from the locker of a colleague.
2014-05-24	Halimi, Muslim	28	Landshut	Bayern	A Kosovar man convicted of false imprisonment rampaged in his cell and broke a window in his cell, cutting his hand in the process. When officers tried to calm him down and get him medical attention, the prisoner lunged at them with a glass shard, injuring two people before eight officers wrestled him to the ground to restrain him. He subsequently died of cardiac arrest.
2014-06-12	N.N.	75	Heinsberg	Nordrhein-Westfalen	Police were called by a woman after her 35-year-old neighbour shouted at her through the door to be let in while holding a metal bar. Shortly after police arrived to deal with the situation, the neighbour's father suddenly appeared and attacked the officers with a knife, the attacker's son joining in with his own knife. During the stabbing, four officers were injured, two of them critically, before one officer shot the neighbour's father in the thigh, causing him to bleed to death in the hallway.
2014-07-11	B., Stephan	46	Asbach-Bäumenheim	Bayern	A police officer was shooting inside and around his house with a private pistol. When a SEK raided the house after negotiations failed, they were shot at, returned fire and killed their colleague. The police officer was presumably suffering from personal problems and in emotional distress.
2014-07-25	Borchardt, Andreas "André"	33	Burghausen	Bayern	A Russian-born German man with prior convictions for possession of and trading drugs was under observation because police suspected he was still dealing; a house search had yielded no contraband besides anabolic steroids. Due to digital evidence that he was planning a deal involving three kilos of cannabis, a warrant was issued, with two policemen waiting outside his flat to arrest him, but upon being spoken to, the man fled into the garden courtyard in the back of the building. Within a timeframe of less than 30 seconds, 35-year-old officer Michael K. commanded him to stop and fired a warning shot before shooting the suspect in the neck. During the investigation, K. insisted that he had aimed for the legs, saying he was not used to the replacement sidearm he was using. No charges were brought against the officer. The deceased's mother, friends and neighbours criticised the officer for shooting an unarmed, fleeing man as well as opening fire where several children had been playing at the same time, also saying that the children suffered psychological damage from being repeatedly questioned by police about the incident.
2014-08-01	Haberstroh, Klaus	55	Freiburg	Baden-Württemberg	32-year-old MEK officer Timo A., who was driving home from a late night police summer party under the influence of alcohol in his private car, caused a hit-and-run accident on A5. A motorcycle driver on the opposite lane was struck and killed in the head-on collision, while the car, rendered unoperable by the crash, came to a halt after going downhill off the road. The officer was left unharmed and fled the scene on foot, hiding at the house of two colleagues for the next nine hours to sober up before turning himself in; a manhunt had been underway for the officer during this timeframe. The policeman was charged with negligent homicide and sentenced to two years in prison and lost his job. An investigation into the colleagues for harboring a criminal was ceased.
2014-08-01	N.N.	36	Petershagen-Eggersdorf	Brandenburg	A 51-year-old police officer killed his girlfriend with his service weapon before killing himself. The woman was discovered dead in the apartment shared with the officer, who had committed suicide by gunshot in Tempelhofer Feld in Berlin by the following day.
2014-08-11	D., Robert	37	Goch	Nordrhein-Westfalen	Police were called after witnesses saw a man running through a public park while exposing himself. When a police car confronted the man at a bridge, he jumped into the Niers below. One officer followed inside and while wadding after the man, the latter turned around and threatened to stab the officer with a knife in his hand. The man continued to approach after the officer drew his gun, and was subsequently shot three times in the chest. He was pulled out of the water died at the scene in spite of reanimation attempts by an ambulance. The deceased had been under the influence of drugs and was thought to be in psychosis, with a previous record for threatening two women at knifepoint.
2014-10-20	Mauch, Walter	77	Stadland	Niedersachsen	Police were called when a retiree called police over an argument with her husband, a retired physician. As police officers were questioning the wife and a caretaker, the man came down the stairs with two handguns and fired one shot at the officers. He refused to lay down his firearms and was shot once in the chest by a 24-year-old officer when he opened fire again. The guns turned out to be gas pistols and the officer was not held responsible for the death. Neighbors stated that the deceased had become eccentric in his later years, both while still a practicing doctor and in private, recommending and selling homeopathic supplements as well as heading a YouTube channel team that produced "alternative media" news.
2014-11-06	N.N.	23	Kassel	Hessen	Police officers were trying to de-escalate an argument between a couple at their apartment in Wesertor when the boyfriend grabbed a 31-year-old police officer's gun and shot him and a 37-year-old policewoman with one bullet, heavily injuring them. A third officer subsequently shot and killed him. He was noted for prior charges related to drug crime.
2014-12-04	N.N.	24	Husum	Schleswig-Holstein	A Somali man slashed a married couple during an argument between asylum seekers at a refugee accommodation. Police were called after the couple managed to flee and shot the attacker when he stormed out of the home armed with several knives.
2014-12-29	S., Michael	46	Moers	Nordrhein-Westfalen	A man under the influence of alcohol and heroin was causing a disturbance at a hospital, where he attempted claim a bed for the night. Two officers, aged 30 and 33, were called to fetch the man and bring him to a drunk tank at the station, but a police physician said that due to keeping him there would be dangerous. The officers released the man, but after he caused another incident at a different hospital, they were told to drive him home to his trailer in Hülsdonk. Instead, they drove to the opposite end of town in Schwafheim and left him there. In the next hours, the man stood in the middle of the road and tried to flag down a car, being struck and killed by the vehicle of a known traffic offender. In December 2016, the officers were each tried and given six months probation for negligent homicide. The driver received a monetary fine.

== 2015 ==
Date (YYYY-MM-DD)	Name	Age	Place	State	Summary of events
2015-01-13	B., Michael	45	Gelsenkirchen	Nordrhein-Westfalen	Neighbours reported a tenant walking around the hallway with a gun in his hands. By the time police arrived, he had barricaded himself in his apartment, necessitating the usage of SEK. The tenant was shot and killed with two shots in the chest when he aimed the gun, a gas pistol, at the officers who broke down his front door. An investigation found that the man was a "sympathizer" for local biker gangs, having falsely claimed recent membership to the Outlaws MC, and had voiced suicidal intentions shortly before the incident via WhatsApp.
2015-02-01	N.N.	31	Bad Zwischenahn	Niedersachsen	A naked man was throwing objects out of his window on the streets and attacked police officers immediately when they arrived at his door. When he tried to stab a policeman who had lain on the ground, after pepper spray usage failed, another officer shot and killed him .
2015-03-11	Suscenko, Grigorij	48	Memmingen	Bayern	An ethnic German Kazakhstani man was supposed to be fetched from his home to serve a year sentence in prison. When officers arrived, the man drew a knife and backed away from them down the street before officers gave chase. After being cornered in an alley, he charged at an officer who shot him three times as a result. It later became public that the previously convicted man had been sentenced for slander and defamation when he insulted a police officer who had come to take away his son to a foster family after his wife won custody over their daughter. The same officer was amongst the six officers sent to take him to prison as well as the one to be attacked and fire the killing shots.
2015-04-28	N.N.	40	Grünstadt	Rheinland-Pfalz	Police was called to negotiate in a dispute between a married couple. When the officers arrived at the apartment, the husband tried to attack them with a knife. He was shot twice in the stomach by a 45-year-old officer and died later in hospital.
2015-05-17	N.N.	74	Rodgau	Hessen	A retired man should be accompanied to a clinic. He refused to be brought there and shot at the paramedics and police officers, who responded fire, killing him. Due to the fact that he was a legal gun owner and the police was expecting resistance, a SEK was already present at the scene.
2015-07-11	M., Jeremy	29	Holzgerlingen	Baden-Württemberg	A French man took the family of his 24-year old ex-girlfriend hostage at gunpoint, consisting of her parents and two teenage siblings. The girlfriend, who was not home at the time, was warned with a written message by her mother and contacted SEK, who were able to secure the hostages before attempting to arrest the man. When he pointed the gun at the officers, he was shot four times, three in the torso and one grazing him, leading to his death at the scene. A later analysis determined that the Modèle 1935A pistol the hostage-taker wielded was loaded with seven rounds, but could not have been fired effectively due to a round getting jammed between the barrel and the chamber.
2015-07-24	P., Philipp	27	Zwickau	Sachsen	Police were called to a bank to reports of a man acting aggressively, after he activated an alarm by kicking an ATM. The man, a bodybuilder, resisted arrest and subjected to a ten-minute fixation by three officers, aged 49 to 52, losing consciousness and dying at the scene. The deceased had a history of drug usage, including crystal meth and steroids, which contributed to an enlarged heart. His cause of death was determined to be heart failure from the stressful positioning. In July 2019, the officers involved were tried for negligent homicide and sentenced to 4000 euro fines each in November.
2015-08-05	N.N.	39	Oberhausen	Nordrhein-Westfalen	A man got into an argument with a 21-year old man and his girlfriend in the vestibule of a police station, which ended with older man injuring the other in a stabbing. and when he refused to put away his knife, police officers fired several shots, killing him.
2015-09-17	Yousef, Rafik Mohamad	41	Spandau	Berlin	An Iraqi Kurdish man was reported for threatening people with a knife. As the first police officer to arrive at the scene emerged from her vehicle, the man attacked, stabbing her in the neck just above her protective vest. Her partner immediately drew his gun and shot the knife-wielding man four times, also heavily injuring the female officer. The man was a member of the jihadist terrorist group Ansar al-Islam and had been previously convicted in 2004 for planning to assassinate Prime Minister of Iraq Ayad Allawi during his visit to Germany. He had removed the ankle bracelet he was required to wear since his release in 2013 only hours before his death.
2015-10-29	N.N.	27	Naumburg	Sachsen-Anhalt	Police was called to a video arcade, because a man under the influence of drugs was threatening an employee with a knife in an attempted robbery. The man ended up non-fatally stabbing the employee and attempted to take another woman hostage when police arrived. Two intervening officers were injured, one critically, before the man was shot by one of the officers.
2015-11-02	Öcal, Nurettin	46	Gronau	Nordrhein-Westfalen	Police was called, because a dispute between a separated Turkish couple and their families on an open street got out of control. The ex-husband had a knife, which he used to stab towards the officers. He was shot twice and died. A ricochet also injured an uninvolved 17-year-old passerby. Police also had to fire two warning shots after the fact, as the deceased's former son-in-law was kicking and insulting the body.
2015-11-28	N.N.	49	Dortmund	Nordrhein-Westfalen	A police cruiser was driving to the site of a traffic accident in Eving when the car struck and killed a man jaywalking on the road. The man died at a hospital while both officers in the car were treated for shock.
2015-12-01	N.N.	48	Erfurt	Thüringen	In the case of the eviction of an apartment, the resident attacked police and firefighters with an axe. As the apartment was stormed, the resident injured an officer with the axe and was shot. He later died in hospital.
2015-12-10	Harms, Jördis	29	Jever	Niedersachsen	30-year old police officer Simon Onken killed his wife with his service pistol, before killing himself. The daughters of the couple, aged two and eight, were also at the scene, but left unharmed. The couple had separated once in the past and their relationship had apparently been deteriorating due to the officer's possessive actions, which included stalking.
2015-12-17	N.N.	61	Nürnberg	Bayern	A police cruiser accidentally ran over a drunk man who was lying on a street at night in St. Leonhard. Although it was dark, a court determined that the street was sufficiently lit for the driver to have seen the man from a distance and he was given a monetary fine on 21 June 2016.

== 2016 ==
Date (YYYY-MM-DD)	Name	Age	Place	State	Summary of events
2016-01-01	N.N.	23	Essen	Nordrhein-Westfalen	A police car struck and killed a pedestrian while responding to a call. Officials said that the accident occurred because it was in the early morning hours and the woman was wearing dark clothing. The 28-year-old officer driving was lightly injured and his colleague treated for shock.
2016-03-02	Durem, Goshi	26	Berlin	Berlin	Four burglars stole 8,000 euro worth of tobacco and alcohol in Werneuchen and escaped in a stolen car. Two unmarked police vehicle were able to stop the car in Marzahn as they drove back into the city, but as other officers went in for the arrest, the getaway driver took a sharp turn and accelerated again. A 38-year-old officer fired a shot at the vehicle, fatally hitting the driver, a Slovene national. Two of the burglars were arrested while the third escaped, but was arrested at his address. The group were all ethnic Albanians living in a refugee accommodation in Köpenick and linked to an organized crime syndicate operating out of the Balkans.
2016-04-19	Arslan, Katip	32	Emmerich	Nordrhein-Westfalen	A Turkish Yazidi man was rampaging at a shop while under the influence of cocaine and amphetamine. He was chased by three police officers, who made use of batons and pepper spray to wrestle him to the ground to fixate him, also kneeing on his back. The man lost consciousness and died at the scene. He had a previous criminal record for possession of drugs, resisting arrest and injuring police officers; the day before his death, he had a court date for the aforementioned offenses.
2016-05-05	N.N.	42	Ludwigshafen	Rheinland-Pfalz	A police patrol in the city center was attacked by a homeless person with a knife. While one officer was wounded, the other was able to stop attacker with the use of his service pistol.
2016-05-06	N.N.	36	Brachbach	Rheinland-Pfalz	Police was called by neighbors, informing that a man was rioting and screaming inside an apartment. He was armed with knives and did not follow orders to leave the house. When police raided the apartment the man attacked police officers. After the use of pepper spray to which he showed no reaction. In the following police shot the man, causing his death. An investigation ended with the conclusion of self defense in November.
2016-05-29	N.N.	28	Filderstadt	Baden-Württemberg	A man was waving around with a machete in a public area. When alerted police units arrived, the man attacked the officers. He was hit by gunshots, dying at the scene.
2016-06-23	Moriello, Sabino	19	Viernheim	Hessen	A man clad in special forces fatigues and armed with a submachine gun and a pistol took 18 people hostage in a cinema screening the children's movie Zoomania. The hostage-taker was killed by the SEK during the rescue operation. It was reported, that the weapons used by the attacker were gas-based firearms and fake handgrenades. The attacker was identified as an unemployed man from Mannheim who had been living with his boyfriend in Gifhorn. He is suspected to have been mentally ill and instigated the hostage situation as an elaborate suicide by cop. A possible right-wing ideology was also suspected when anti-Turkish text messages surfaced, but not officially investigated by state authorities.
2016-07-04	N.N.	30	Jena	Thüringen	29-year-old police cadet Christoph W. killed his ex-girlfriend by bludgeoning. W. did not accept the break-up and when she compared him to her new boyfriend during a meeting, he knocked her unconscious with a bottle before beating the woman to death with a dumbbell. He was sentenced to 7 years imprisonment for manslaughter in 2017, due to diminished responsibility on account of alcoholism.
2016-07-07	N.N.	31	Groß Rosenburg	Sachsen-Anhalt	Police responded to an emergency call. A family of hunters had a serious argument, a member was threatening others with a handgun. Thus it was known, that several firearms are stored inside the house, a SEK took over control, killing the family's son that was armed with a revolver.
2016-07-13	Thomas, Amos	62	Erharting	Bayern	Police was instructed to support the transfer of a special care home resident to a psychiatric hospital due to the Liberian national being a diagnosed schizophrenic. When police arrived, the resident attacked the officers with a knife, injuring both of them. He was killed by at least three gunshots.
2016-07-18	Ahmadzai, Riaz Khan	17	Würzburg	Bayern	Würzburg train attack: An underage Afghan asylum-seeker injured several passengers, four Hong Kong tourists and a German woman, with a hatchet. During his escape he was shot by a SEK. The investigation showed doubts in the terrorist's identity, origin and age. It is assumed that he was a Pashtun from Pakistan and got radicalized shortly before the attack, admitting himself to the IS, who referred to him as "Muhammad Riyad" during a report on Amaq.
2016-08-18	N.N.	53	Dortmund	Nordrhein-Westfalen	SEK raided an apartment in Neuasseln to arrest its tenant, a suspected pimp wanted for child abuse and other violent crimes. The suspect opened fire on the officers, injuring at least one. During the shootout the suspect was killed.
2016-09-27	Fadl Hussein, Hussam	29	Berlin	Berlin	Hussam Fadl Hussein, an Iraqi refugee, was fatally shot by police outside of a refugee housing unit in Berlin-Moabit. Hussein, an electrician and former police officer, and his wife Zaman Gate had come to Germany in 2014 with their three children from Baghdad. Hussein called police to arrest another refugee, 27 year old Pakistani Tayyab M., who, according to the family and other residents, had pulled their six-year-old daughter behind a bush and tried to molest her. Once Tayyab M. was placed inside a squad car, Hussein sprinted towards the vehicle, at which point three officers shot at him. It is unclear due to several conflicting accounts whether Hussein was armed, with multiple police officers and eyewitnesses reporting that he was unarmed, while one of the shooters later presented a knife that allegedly belonged to Hussein, even though it was not seen or found at the scene, nor matching fingerprints or DNA were determined. Some newspapers stated that Hussein had yelled "You will not survive this!" while running towards the car, but police reports do not mention this. Tayyab M. admitted to molesting Hussein's daughter, stating "it was spontaneous, an opportunity presented itself - girl or woman, I didn't care", and was given six months probation before he was deported. The prosecutor's office quit their investigation in 2021, but Hussein's widow filed a constitutional complaint, which was granted in August 2023, but denied in April 2024.
2016-10-17	Demirçivi, Taner	39	Bielefeld	Nordrhein-Westfalen	A Turkish man was causing a disturbance in an apartment building after his separated wife threw him out of her flat during a visit because he was under the influence of alcohol and cocaine. Five police officers were dispatched and upon arrival, an officer immediately punched the man in the face while another used pepper spray on him. He was then tied-up and left in a prone position before losing consciousness. The man died at a hospital from cardiac arrest.
2016-10-17	N.N.	48	Moers	Nordrhein-Westfalen	Police was called to a traffic accident at Moers station after a car collided with a bicycle. The cyclist had initially fled the scene before being chased and returned by a witness, but upon noticing the police's presence, he pulled out a knife and walked towards the officers. After several warnings, three shots were fired, one hitting the man, who died later in hospital, even though the officers did successfully a CPR on him.
2016-10-18	N.N.	34	Hagen	Nordrhein-Westfalen	A man entered an insurance bureau in Kabel and got into an argument with one of the insurance agents working there. The man stabbed the 49-year-old employee several times with a knife and hit him with a machete. After the severely injured was fleeing outside and hiding in a nearby snack bar, the arriving police shot the man after he tried to attack the officers. The attacker, who had immigrated from Russia before the collapse of the Soviet Union as a child, was later described as an odd person with delusions, such as claiming contact with extraterrestrials and identifying a neighbor as a "shepherd from 10,000 years ago", as well as a prior record for injuring a person in a stabbing. The employee survived with heavy injuries.
2016-11-06	G., Pia	18	Hannover	Niedersachsen	A police vehicle collided head-on with a moped after the officers overtook a bus. The moped driver, a pizza delivery worker, died at a hospital from her injuries. The 53-year-old police officer driving the car, Rene H., and his 23-year-old colleague were driving to assist a fire department call and did not have their siren on. In 2017, a court convicted H. for negligent homicide and he was sentenced to a fine of 7650 euro.
2016-11-26	N.N.	37	Hamburg	Hamburg	Police was called to an apartment building in Barmbek, where an Afghan resident was reported for wielding a knife in the stairway. When the officers encountered the man armed with two knives they used pepper spray on him, to which he didn't react. When being attacked, at least one officer fired upon the perpetrator, who died later in hospital despite emergency surgery.

== 2017 ==
Date (YYYY-MM-DD)	Name	Age	Place	State	Summary of events
2017-01-08	N.N.	43	Duisburg	Nordrhein-Westfalen	A man entered the foyer of a police station in Rheinhausen, broke a window and attacked two officers with a knife. After pepper spray usage failed, both officers fired once at the attacker, fatally striking him in the leg and neck. The same man had injured two men, aged 34 and 33, and a 23-year-old woman in three separate attacks in the previous hours. stabbing them in the hip, neck, and stomach respectively.
2017-01-25	Lux, Ilse	57	Bonn	Nordrhein-Westfalen	A police car struck a pedestrian while driving back to the police station in Ramersdorf, with the 28-year-old officer acknowledging that he had overlooked the woman. Despite an off-duty paramedic immediately providing first aid to the injured woman, she died of severe head injuries at the scene. In May 2020, woman's widowed husband unsuccessfully sued the police department for damages.
2017-01-31	S., Daniel	25	Berlin	Berlin	Emergency responders called the police in assistance to a case of a man, who threatened to hurt others and kill himself in his apartment complex in Neu-Hohenschönhausen. He also threatened to shoot through his apartment door, while the paramedics were talking to the man. Police broke into the apartment through the door. When the man was not reacting to police orders to put a knife down, he was shot. No firearms were found in the flat.
2017-02-19	N.N.	30	Herten	Nordrhein-Westfalen	Police were called by a 72-year-old woman about a potential break-in after she heard glass shattering. In the building, the officers were attacked with a knife by the home invader who was subsequently shot. He was a Tunisian asylum seeker and had escaped a mental facility the same day.
2017-03-01	N.N.	63	Koblenz	Rheinland-Pfalz	A police car struck an elderly pedestrian while pulling out of a police station's parking lot. The man died from his injuries at a hospital. Officials attributed the accident to insufficient pavement markings and bad lighting, despite it having taken place at noon at cloudy weather.
2017-03-17	N.N.	42	Emmendingen	Baden-Württemberg	A 58-year old police officer shot his wife and dog with his service pistol, before killing himself.
2017-04-08	N.N.	33	Pleidelsheim	Baden-Württemberg	A trio of burglars were caught by a police patrol after breaking into an office building. Two of them fled while the third attacked a 53-year-old officer with a sharp tool. The man was shot and heavily injured. The two other burglars, a man and a woman, both aged 26, as well as their 18-year-old getaway driver were caught three days after the shooting. The group were all identified as Hungarian nationals. The injured burglar died on 25 April at a hospital.
2017-04-12	N.N.	64	Beetzseeheide	Brandenburg	A retiree was reported missing after he mentioned his plans to kill himself. Police found him in a forest near Gortz and were threatened by him with a gun. After he refused to listen to commands to put down the weapon, an officer injured him by shooting him in the thigh, but he managed to escape deeper into the woods. A SEK tracked the man down and fatally shot him officers when he pointed his gun at them.
2017-04-16	N.N.	35	Braunschweig	Niedersachsen	After rioting in a brothel a man was pepper sprayed by police officers and arrested. Later he died in police custody due to heart failure.
2017-04-16	N.N.	30	Herne	Nordrhein-Westfalen	A man was sitting on a disposed couch on the sidewalk in Sodingen and cutting himself with a large knife, due to which passerby and residents called police. Two officers were approaching the man when he suddenly got up and ran at the pair. After shouting several warnings, the male officer shot the man, heavily injuring him, also injuring the female officer with a ricochet. The attacker later died at a hospital.
2017-04-27	Haile, Mikael	22	Essen	Nordrhein-Westfalen	A resident in Altendorf called in a noise complaint because a neighbour, an Eritrean refugee, was singing loudly. When police knocked on the tenant's door, he opened with a knife in his hand. After ignoring repeated commands to put down the weapon, he was shot once in the heart.
2017-05-04	N.N.	61	Emmendingen	Baden-Württemberg	Police were called to a rehab center because a patient was behaving aggressively. When the officers arrived, one of them was attacked by the patient with a knife, and after he did not respond to pepper spray, another officer fired three shots, with at least one killing the attacker.
2017-05-22	N.N.	40	Bonn	Nordrhein-Westfalen	The residents of an apartment building in Plittersdorf called police after hearing loud noises coming from the neighbouring flat of a Hungarian couple. Because the front door was blocked off, officers entered over the balcony via a fire engine's ladder. Inside, they found the bodies of a 39-year-old woman and her three-year-old daughter, stabbed and strangled to death respectively. Police found the woman's heavily injured husband inside the locked bathroom, wielding a knife, and during a confrontation, the man attacked the officers, leading to him being fatally shot. It's assumed that the incident was a botched murder-suicide and that the man had failed to fatally wound himself before police arrival.
2017-05-25	N.N.	46	Echzell	Hessen	57-year-old police officer Rainer K. killed his wife, a Polish national, with his service weapon before killing himself. A passerby had called police after hearing the couple arguing in their basement and despite attempts to negotiate, the officer shot himself in the head in front of the response team.
2017-06-01	Kabasakal, Savaş	42	Frankfurt am Main	Hessen	A mentally ill Turkish man was subject to an eviction of his apartment in Höchst enforced by seven police officers. His wife, who was the official tenant, had stopped paying rent after being thrown out by her husband following an argument stemming from the fact that he had emptied most of the furniture and appliances without her knowledge, claiming they were "emitting radiation". Officers stated that the tall obese man had become physical while preventing entry and collapsed during the scuffle, being declared dead at the scene despite reanimation attempts. Police stated that he was on several medications and suffered from asthma due to which they believed his death was a result of a medical emergency. It was later revealed that the man was also heavily beaten by the officers and covered in bruises when paramedics found him, with police responding that the amount of force applied during the eviction was permissible.
2017-06-03	K., Mostafa	41	Arnschwang	Bayern	An Afghan asylum seeker took a five-year-old boy hostage with a knife in a refugee accommodation after injuring his 47-year-old Russian mother because he was angered by the children playing loudly. By the time police arrived, the man had slashed the boy's throat. An officer fired eight shots at the man, with one fatally striking him in the chest. Police attempted to provide first aid on the boy, but he died of blood loss. The deceased had previously served six years imprisonment for arson and was required to wear an ankle bracelet. During his sentence, he had converted to Christianity and because Christians were subject to persecution in his native Afghanistan, he could not be deported. He was still under supervision by federal authorities as part of his criminal rehabilitation program at the time of the killing.
2017-06-19	P., Robert	50	Heidelberg	Baden-Württemberg	44-year old police officer Daniel P. killed his brother with three shots from his service pistol, before committing suicide. The brothers had driven out to a camping site in Schlierbach, where the officer took his gun from the trunk and opened fire after an argument.
2017-07-11	H., Daniel	28	Thale	Sachsen-Anhalt	A man threatened his grandmother with a Kalashnikov rifle in their shared home in Weddersleben. 20 officers from SEK and Kripo responded to the call. The man had locked himself in his room and fired on SEK when they entered the house, injuring a 27-year-old SEK officer before the attacker was fatally shot. Several more weapons, including blunt and sharp instruments, were found in the man's room.
2017-07-30	Sendi, Rozaba	34	Konstanz	Baden-Württemberg	2017 Konstanz shooting: An Iraqi Kurdish man was thrown out of a night club after an argument with the owner, his brother-in-law. He returned shortly after wielding a M16 rifle and opened fire on the entrance, killing 50-year-old bouncer Ramazan Ögütlü and injured five more security personnel and guests with gunshots. Although fatally wounded in the face, Ögütlü was able to lock the door before losing consciousness, preventing the shooter from getting inside the booked-out venue. After a shootout with SEK, during which he injured an officer by shooting him in the helmet, the man was wounded by gunfire and died at a hospital a few hours later. The deceased had prior convictions for violent crime and drug offenses, was under the influence of drugs and alcohol at the time, and was also affiliated with the PKK. He bought the rifle through a 30-year-old Austrian contact from a 32-year-old German national living in Switzerland. On 30 June 2019, both men received monetary fines of 1500 franc.
2017-08-04	N.N.	23	Mittelherwigsdorf	Sachsen	Police were called by a 47-year-old woman because her son had threatened her with physical violence. When police arrived, the man approached the officers with a butcher's knife in his raised hand and was shot three times from a short distance. He had a psychiatric record and was slightly inebriated at the time of his death.
2017-10-04	G., Borak	45	Hamburg	Hamburg	A man with a history of mental illness checked himself into a hospital in Bergedorf. After a check-up, a doctor suggested that he should be transferred to a stationary ward, with judge's approval, but upon being informed by nurses, the man pulled out two knives and threatened staff. Two police officers were called in and attempted to incapacitate the man with pepper spray while keeping him at bay with protective shields. He then attacked one of the officers, lightly injuring him, leading both 36-year-old and 28-year-old officers to open fire. He was heavily injured and stabilised after emergency surgery, but died in the evening.
2017-10-23	N.N.	54	Alsfeld	Hessen	Police was called to a house where gunshots were heard. When the arriving police officers identified that the shots were live rounds, the SEK was called to handle the situation. Attempts to negotiate with the shooter - a drunk man - failed and he began shooting at the police officers. He was then shot twice and hit deadly.
2017-10-28	N.N.	19	Mörfelden-Walldorf	Hessen	A teenager got into an argument with a 24-year-old man, which ended with the former stabbing the other with a knife and stealing his backpack. Five police officers found him walking on a nearby street and commanded him to drop the knife. He instead approached the officers, and after several more warnings, three officers fired 26 shots in total, hitting him several times in arms, legs and one fatal shot to the chest. He died during medical care of an emergency physician at the scene. The three officers were investigated, but the shooting was ruled self-defense.
2017-12-08	N.N.	59	Ernsthausen	Hessen	A mentally ill man attacked a 50-year old woman at his 60-year old girlfriend's flat with a broom, repeatedly hitting her in the head. Police restrained the man to perform an arrest, during which he collapsed and died of heart failure.

== 2018 ==
Date (YYYY-MM-DD)	Name	Age	Place	State	Summary of events
2018-01-13	N.N.	63	Fulda	Hessen	A man was threatening his family with a pistol, firing at least one shot and repeatedly pointing the weapon at his 66-year-old brother. SEK were called in and subdued the man with a taser shot. He subsequently collapsed and was brought to a hospital, where he died.
2018-01-22	N.N.	41	Darmstadt	Hessen	Police was called to a case of domestic violence at the home of a Kazakhstani family. Two officers arrived to find a man, the husband of the caller, armed with two knives waiting for them at the front door. He attacked them and died after both officers shot at him.
2018-01-29	Martini, Fabien	21	Berlin	Berlin	A police cruiser driven by 50-year old officer Peter Gawronska was responding to a robbery, which later turned out to be a false alarm, in Berlin-Mitte when he crashed into the side of another car, killing the other motorist. Gawronska had been driving at 134 km/h and slowed to 90 km/h just before the collision. Initial investigation focused on possible wrongdoing by the deceased and it was widely reported that she may have distracted from using a phone, although this was ultimately determined to not be the case. In July 2019, it was revealed that Gawronska was being held on suspicion of manslaughter and had a 1,1 blood alcohol level at the time of the accident. The blood test was not approved as evidence until he was tried on 29 July and in December 2020, Gawronska was sentenced to 18 months probation and was fired. However, in September 2021, he was retried and instead given a fine of 12,900 euro, after the court stated that despite his intoxication, Gawronska's reaction speed was in line with that of a sober individual, which would mean that driving drunk had no impact in the crash, lessening his criminal responsibility.
2018-02-09	Paksoy, Hamit	43	Wuppertal	Nordrhein-Westfalen	SEK raided an apartment to serve a warrant for attempted murder. The wanted person was the president of a boxing club that served as a known front for the Turkish nationalist biker club Osmanen Germania, of which he was a member. Police had been warned that the man owned two guns, but he was unarmed at the time and dressed only in an undershirt and towel. He was shot once in the chest, the bullet having passed through an arm he had thrown up in defense. The circumstances that led to the death were investigated by police and the persecutions office. In January 2019 it was concluded that the death of Hamit P. was a tragic accident. The officer interpreted the flash and blast of a stun grenade that was used as a gunshot and the cellphone in the victim's hand as a pistol.
2018-03-01	B., Bekir	27	Neubrandenburg	Mecklenburg-Vorpommern	A female passerby reported an ongoing robbery occurring at a kiosk. Police were able to apprehend the three suspects, an uncle-nephew pair and a friend of the nephew, by drawing their guns, but one of them, a Turkish German from Berlin, used pepper spray on an officer, who shot the man in the torso. He died at a hospital the same day. The deceased and one of the accomplices were later linked to the Lebanese Miri-Clan, whose members and sympathisers threatened police on social media.
2018-04-13	Jabarkhil, Matiullah	19	Fulda	Hessen	An Afghan refugee attacked a bakery worker, injuring him in the head, and threw stones at the windows after being informed that the store had not yet opened. Upon police arrival, the man also threw stones at squad cars before taking a baton from an officer, whom he injured in the arm. After the attacker was hit by several shots he bled to death. The deceased had a history of mental illness and previous incidents of assault and threatening at his accommodation. Criticism was raised upon the number of shots fired by police. 12 shots were fired, but only four hit the body, two were considered deadly.
2018-04-19	F., Michael	38	Langenfeld	Nordrhein-Westfalen	Police responded to an emergency call, that a man was firing a pistol from his balcony. The police decided to storm the apartment. When the SEK officers were being shot at while entering the apartment, they returned fire. The man later died in hospital. The gun was identified as gas pistol and police stated that the man had a history of drug abuse and visual hallucinations.
2018-05-11	A., Tim	24	Hamburg	Hamburg	A police vehicle struck and killed a pedestrian in Harburg while responding to a call about a suspected sex offender on the run. The officers did not see the man as he was obscured behind a parked truck before he stepped into their path. It was not stated how fast the police car was driving, but it stopped immediately after the accident and left a 50-meter skid mark. A court found the officer driving, 35-year old Gregor L., guilty of negligent homicide and determined that he had been over the limit at 125 km/h, receiving a fine of 7,200 euro in 2020.
2018-05-30	J., Mahmood	24	Flensburg	Schleswig-Holstein	Flensburg stabbing: While travelling in an ICE train, a 22-year-old off-duty uniformed officer of the Bremen Police was stabbed in the face by a man with a knife as she went to exit at her stop. A 35-year-old fellow passenger separated the two and was severely injured before the officer fatally shot the attacker. The deceased was identified as an Eritrean refugee who had suspected psychiatric issues, having previously been put under supervision for assaulting another refugee by biting him on 6 April and hitting a neighbour in the head with an iron bar on 16 April.
2018-09-17	Ahmad, Amad	26	Kleve	Nordrhein-Westfalen	A Syrian Kurdish refugee was arrested in Geldern on 8 July on suspicion of sexual harassment for making lewd gestures at a group of women, which included the daughter of a police officer, who placed the call to her father's private phone. While being booked, police wrongly identified him as a wanted thief, a Malian refugee named Amedy Guira, who used a number of aliases including variations of "Ahmad Amed". Although there were several discrepancies such as height, place of origin, skin colour and age, the officer responsible did not compare the arrestee with the file photo they had and put him in detention. A police psychologist similarly claimed that her sessions with the refugee, in which he adamantly denied being Guira, were indicative that he was untrustworthy. Two months later, under unclear circumstances, a fire broke out in his cell. When the prison staff recognized the situation and acted, he was heavily injured and died five days later in hospital. It was later found that Amedy Guira had already been deported in January.
2018-10-19	N., Tim	25	Kirchheim an der Weinstraße	Rheinland-Pfalz	A 56-year old woman called police, stating that her son had attacked her after experiencing a drug-induced psychosis. Two officers were dispatched to their residence, where they were attacked by the son, heavily injuring both a 31-year policewoman and her 56-year old colleague with a pair of scissors. The attacker was subsequently shot seven times, leading to his death at the scene. His mother was found to have died shortly before the officers' arrival from several stab wounds and head injuries inflicted by her son. The attacker was known to have psychiatric problems and recently relapsed into substance abuse after getting clean.
2018-10-22	Dursun, Ümit	43	Nürnberg	Bayern	A Turkish man under the influence of drugs was trashing his apartment in Gostenhof and when SEK arrived, he threatened to jump from his balcony while breaking neighbours' flower pots. He was shot with a taser and then administered a sedative by an emergency physician. The man then lost consciousness and died at a hospital the same night.
2018-10-27	N.N.	39	Braunschweig	Niedersachsen	Police was called to an apartment building, where two unknown intruders were yelling loudly and disturbing neighbors. When the two persons were fleeing, a third person came out of a neighboring house and walked towards the officers, armed with a handgun. When ignoring orders to put the gun down, police shot the man four times. The handgun later was identified as a gas pistol. The police officers who wore plain clothes, but it is unclear if they identified themselves properly and/or if the victim did recognized them as police officers. Testimony by neighbors of the deceased, who was serving secretary of the Wolfenbüttel chapter of the Red Devils MC, indicated that the intruders had attempted to break into the deceased's flat through the front door.
2018-11-04	Lieser-Vaccaro, Anouk	45	Merzig	Saarland	49-year old police officer Pascal Lieser-Vaccaro shot his wife with his service pistol, before killing himself. The wife had reportedly sought to divorce.
2018-11-07	L., Robin	21	Bad Oldesloe	Schleswig-Holstein	Police responded to an emergency call, reporting a man with a knife in front of a swimming hall. The described man was identified as a known homeless person, that was suffering from mental illness. Although he had committed minor crimes before, he was considered peaceful and no threat to the public. The man was ordered to put the knife down. Despite a warning shot and the use of pepper spray the man refused to follow the order and started stabbing in the direction of police officers. A 32-year old officer shot twice, hitting him in the chest. He died on the scene.
2018-11-26	Rolf, Julian	23	Bonn	Nordrhein-Westfalen	Two police officers were in preparation to go to a shooting training at the main police station in Ramersdorf, when one shot from his partner's pistol hit a police officer's neck. He fell into a coma and died two weeks later. It is still unclear why and under which circumstances he was shot. It was leaked that investigators suspect that his partner, 22-year old Niklas H., accidentally mistook his real life gun with a training dummy pistol and wanted to scare his colleague. During the trial, the defense instead argued that he had been inspecting his gun when he was scared by a noise and instinctively pulled the trigger. On 1 September 2019, H. was sentenced to 2 years probation and a 3000 euro fine.
2018-12-09	N.N.	28	Rosa	Thüringen	A woman called police because her friend was being stalked by her ex-boyfriend from nearby Bad Liebenstein and had been seen holding a pistol. When the officers arrived at the scene, they were shot at from the man. He was hit and severely injured by return fire and died later in hospital. The deceased had stolen the weapon and ammunition from a relative, who was a sports shooter.
2018-12-16	N., Rolf	74	Bochum	Nordrhein-Westfalen	Over the course of a day, police received several calls from a known alcoholic as well as complaints from his neighbours who reported him for disturbing the peace. After neighbours called over possible property damage, two officers were dispatched to the apartment building in Altenbochum to perform an arrest. The man did not respond to commands and instead pulled out a lighter in the shape of a revolver from his pants. The officers ordered the man to drop the weapon after which 35-year old officer Marcel B. fired three shots at the man, who died at the scene. Despite initial assumptions, it was found that the deceased was not intoxicated at the time and investigators concluded that he was likely suffering from mental illness and financial difficulties, possibly having planned the incident as a suicide by cop. The officer was tried for manslaughter, but found not guilty in 2021.
2018-12-27	L., Aristeidis	36	Berlin	Berlin	A Greek tourist with a history of mental illness had started a fight inside a bakery in Tempelhof. Police officers encountered him shirtless and vandalising the store's interior. He was arrested after heavily resisting and inside the police car, he repeatedly hit his head against the windows. At the station, despite being in hand and foot restrains, the man continued to resist officers, leading them to use pepper spray before four officers held him down in a prone position. The man subsequently lost consciousness and after receiving first aid and CPR, he was brought to an ICU, where he died on 12 January 2019 from the aftereffects of "positional asphyxiation".

== 2019 ==
Date (YYYY-MM-DD)	Name	Age	Place	State	Summary of events
2019-01-18	N.N.	56	Pirmasens	Rheinland-Pfalz	A man was severely resisting to be brought to a psychiatric hospital. A police officer used his taser against the man, who suffered a heart attack and died shortly after being transferred to the emergency room.
2019-02-28	Konrad, Julian	21	Würzburg	Bayern	19-year old Bereitschaftspolizei cadet Kai M. accidentally shot another fellow cadet inside police barracks. The unintentional discharge of the handgun occurred when the two cadets were alone in a room, shortly before going on guard duty. Even though investigations were not finished yet, the Minister of the Interior of the state of Bavaria Joachim Herrmann referred to the cause of the incident as a wrongly unloaded weapon.
2019-02-28	N.N.	46	Solingen	Nordrhein-Westfalen	Police was called to help in a family conflict that escalated. A woman had a marital spat with her husband the previous day, after which he left and had returned home heavily intoxicated. Two officers arrived when the wife was running out of the house chased by her husband. While attempting to talk out the argument in the kitchen with the couple, the man grabbed an item off a counter and ran at the officers. A 24-year old officer opened fire on the attacker, who died later that night. Although it was initially reported that the husband was wielding a knife, it was determined in 2020 that he had actually been holding a vegetable peeler, after which the wife and daughter of the deceased filed for 200,000 euro in pain and suffering.
2019-04-11	K., Peter	28	Salzgitter	Niedersachsen	A man called emergency services for medical assistance, saying that a person had been shot. Officers asked for SEK after the caller barricaded himself in the apartment and was seen with a "pistol-shaped object". The man threatened the SEK units with a gun and was shot after lengthy negotiations. He died shortly after from a bullet piercing his spine. His weapon turned out to be a toy gun. Inside the apartment, officers subsequently found the body of a 22-year-old man, who is presumed to have been murdered by the deceased several days earlier in what investigators suspect to have been a drug-related crime.
2019-04-18	W., Dieter	77	Bochum	Nordrhein-Westfalen	A witness called the police, because he saw a man on the local cemetery in Gerthe, armed with a rifle. Police officers felt threatened by the man and shot him three times in the chest. He died later in hospital. Investigations revealed that the man was a hunter, ordered to control the rabbit population. The hunter's wife, who was also present at the scene, claimed her husband lay down his rifle immediately when the officers arrived and the shots were fired while the hunter was kneeling on the ground.
2019-04-29	N.N.	27	Hamburg	Hamburg	Police was called to help in an emergency situation where a man was acting aggressively at an auto shop in Rotherbaum and had beaten a mechanic. The attacker had been put into the office by his uncle and other employees, but when two officers arrived, the man attacked them with a knife, slashing a 20-year-old policewoman in the face before he was disarmed by his uncle and the other officer, who was also injured by repeated punches and kicks. The man was brought to the police station and had to be fixated, due to his aggressive behavior. After calming down, the fixation was freed. When being transferred to a cell he became aggressive again, so that enchaining was necessary. Shortly after his resistance he suffered from cardiac arrest and died in hospital on 6 May 2019. It was later found that the deceased had extensive stays at a psychiatric facility. The death occurred three days after that of 34-year-old Cameroonian national William Tonou-Mbobda, who was beaten and fixated by three hospital security guards because he left the psychiatric wing of the UKE, where he was being treated for schizophrenia, to smoke a cigarette by the entrance. Investigations were announced for both cases in May 2019, but each trial cleared the defendants of wrongdoing.
2019-04-30	N.N.	49	Frankfurt	Hessen	A physician called the police as backup by transferring a patient from his apartment in Ostend to a psychiatric hospital. When the discussion with the heavily overweight patient, who also suffered from diabetes, became aggressive, a taser was used against the man, who collapsed and vomited. He was brought to a hospital and died there four days later. The death was caused by pneumonia, as a long-term consequence of getting vomit to the lungs.
2019-05-22	Osborn, Oisín	34	Hamburg	Hamburg	An Airbus engineer with dual British/Irish citizenship was fatally shot in Hausbruch after his wife called police, saying her husband was wielding a knife and acting erratically; he had blacked out all windows and brought kitchen implements into the bedroom to "protect [his family] from evil". Police encountered the husband out in a stairwell, wearing only his underwear, a home-made loincloth and a saucepan on his head. Officers opened fire when they saw a handle sticking out under the fabric, initially believed to be that of a knife, but later found to be a spatula. His mother later stated that her son suffered from rapid mood swings after being prescribed medication to treat an allergy he developed following the birth of his newborn son ten days earlier, possibly in a case of sudden psychosis. In November 2024, the deceased's parents filed a complaint to the European Court of Human Rights to reinvestigate the killing and have the officer tried in court.
2019-06-11	N.N.	81	Bielefeld	Nordrhein-Westfalen	A 43-year-old police officer fatally stabbed his mother before killing himself at their apartment in Hillegossen. The officer had been suspended from duty due to depression.
2019-06-18	B., Adel	32	Essen	Nordrhein-Westfalen	An Algerian-born German man was shot dead by the police in Altendorf after he called them and threatened to kill himself. He argued with the officers for several minutes, holding a knife he had used to cut himself. Police initially stated that when officers arrived, he rushed with the knife towards them and was shot. After a few weeks, two smartphone videos were published on YouTube that contradict this version: The man was walking back into his apartment building with police a distance behind him when one officer ran forwards and shot the man from behind through the closed (glass panel) door. Nevertheless, the local prosecutors' office closed the case against the policeman after two months, citing self-defence.
2019-07-21	N.N.	28	Bruchsal	Baden-Württemberg	A man suspected of theft at a gas station in Karlsruhe was repeatedly fixated by six police officers during his arrest, at the local police station and subsequent transport to jail due to his heavy resistance, which included biting and spitting. He had to be reanimated at a hospital, where he died on 1 August. The circumstances that led to the man's death are unclear.
2019-08-17	Alizada, Aman	19	Stade	Niedersachsen	A resident at a refugee accommodation called police because another resident, an Afghan Hazara man with known mental issues, was threatening to damage his own room. Arriving officers saw from a window that the man was playing loud music and singing while holding a barbell. An officer kicked the door open and fatally shot the man five times in the torso. Police claimed that the man charged at the officer, but forensics showed the rounds struck downwards, suggesting a crouched, sitting, or lying position of the deceased, when the shots were fired. Officers also claimed that they unsuccessfully used copious amounts of pepper spray on the deceased from the window before entering, but no trace of the chemicals were found at the scene. The death was heavily protested due to the deceased's age and ethnicity, and accusations of police misconduct.
2019-09-11	R., Paweł	25	Hellersdorf	Brandenburg	After receiving reports of a suspect wanted in connection with a murder hours earlier in Gorzów in neighbouring Poland, a car with a matching licence plate was stopped by police on A10. The driver then pointed a gun at the officers and after repeated commands to lower the weapon were ignored, the officers opened fire, mortally wounding the man, who died the same day at a hospital. The driver was identified as the fugitive, who had shot and killed his 26-year-old Ukrainian ex-girlfriend in the laundry room of their apartment building with the same gun he threatened police with. He had been fined for harassment of the victim in June. In October, two Gorów police officers were fired due to their failures in properly handle previous reports of stalking by the deceased.
2019-10-30	N.N.	45	Recklinghausen	Nordrhein-Westfalen	Police responding to an emergency call were confronted by a man who grabbed a pocket knife upon seeing the officers. After being repeatedly warned to drop the weapon, he approached the officers and was shot as a result. The bullet hit an artery, to which he died in hospital later.
2019-11-01	N.N.	55	Ahrensburg	Schleswig-Holstein	Police arrested a car driver, who resisted heavily. Through the fixation, he suffered from a heart attack, that led to his death.
2019-11-02	N.N.	26	Hoppstädten-Weiersbach	Rheinland-Pfalz	An Eritrean homeless man attacked a member of a tennis club with an axe after an argument, also damaging his car as he drove off. Police confronted him, but he fled after being pepper sprayed, later being found crouching near a storage shed on the tennis club grounds. As officers approached the man, he suddenly jumped at them and he was shot in the head as a result.
2019-11-02	N.N.	52	Lübeck	Schleswig-Holstein	Police were called by a visitor of the city park in St. Gertrud because a threatening man had spoken to him and his daughter. The man shot at arriving police with a gas pistol, with the officers firing 8 shots in return, with two fatally striking the shooter in the torso. The deceased had an extensive criminal record for violent crime and robberies, and was on probation at the time of the incident. It is presumed to be a suicide by police incident.
2019-12-07	M., Max	25	Wuppertal	Nordrhein-Westfalen	A man was using a hammer to break car mirrors and threaten passerby. He was shot six times in the torso after he attacked called-in police officers. An investigation was ceased in November 2020.
2019-12-15	N.N.	44	Mannheim	Baden-Württemberg	The family of a resident in Waldhof called police because he had been acting "erratic". When the officers arrived, the man proceeded to cut himself with a knife and attacked them with a knife and was shot.
2019-12-28	N.N.	32	Stuttgart	Baden-Württemberg	Police were called after a car in Vaihingen drove the wrong way in a roundabout and crashed into an advertising column. When officers arrived, the driver and his passenger, both Serbian nationals, attempted to escape on foot. Two officers chased after them and when they caught up to the driver, he attacked them with a sword. After pepper spray proved ineffective, they shot the driver multiple times. He died later in hospital. Questioning of the passenger, who was the driver's 69-year-old mother, as well as the search of their apartment in Balingen indicated that the deceased had been mentally ill and hoarded weapons, including a crossbow, another sword and multiple gas pistols.

== See also ==
- Lists of killings by law enforcement officers
- Use of firearms by police in Germany
- List of killings by law enforcement officers in post-reunification Germany (1990s)
- List of killings by law enforcement officers in post-reunification Germany (2000s)
- List of killings by law enforcement officers in post-reunification Germany (2020s)
