= Dubenec =

Dubenec may refer to places in the Czech Republic:

- Dubenec (Příbram District), a municipality and village in the Central Bohemian Region
- Dubenec (Trutnov District), a municipality and village in the Hradec Králové Region
- Dubenec, a village and part of Dívčice in the South Bohemian Region
