= Killing of Emrah Kara =

Emrah Kara was killed by a special police unit on 20 December 2013, whilst having a schizophrenic episode at his mother's house in the village of Holzminden in Germany.

== Killing ==
Emrah Kara was a Turkish man who had moved to German village of Holzminden with his mother and sister in 2008 in order to study at university. On 20 December 2013, Kara's actions concerned his family since he had taken hold of a knife and refused help. He had previously been diagnosed as schizophrenic and had recently stopped taking his medication, so his family called a doctor, who in turn called the police. The police then dispatched a special unit, known as the SEK. The SEK sent a police dog into Kara's bedroom to disarm him, and he killed the dog. A SEK officer then shot Kara dead. Kara was buried in his birthplace of Amasya in Turkey.

== Legacy ==
A week later, over 1,000 people marched through Holzminden to protest the killing. Kara's death was widely reported in Turkey.
