= Killing of André Borchardt =

2014 police shooting death in Burghausen, Germany

- Burghausen (Bavaria) Burghausen (Germany)
- Location: Burghausen, Bavaria, Germany
- Date: 25 July 2014; 12 years ago c. 17:50 (CEST)
- Attack type: Homicide by shooting
- Weapon: Handgun (Walther PPK or Heckler & Koch P7)
- Victim: André Borchardt
- Charges: None

On 25 July 2014, 33-year-old André Borchardt was killed by Bavarian Police in Burghausen, Bavaria, Germany. He was wanted by warrant for selling cannabis and fatally shot while running from officers.

The killing garnered national media attention and caused protests across the state, as Borchardt was unarmed and not posing an active danger. An investigation into a wrongful death case ceased in 2016 and the officer responsible was not charged.

== Background ==
Since reunification, Germany has maintained a comparatively low rate of fatal police encounters, although the rates have increased since the early 2010s. From 2004 to 2013, an average of eight people were fatally annually shot by German police, the majority of whom were armed with bladed weapons. Police killings previously generated controversy and led to protests in cases with those who suffered from mental illness (i.e. the 2008 killing of Tennessee Eisenberg or the 2013 killing of Manuel F.) or were part of a racial minority (i.e. the 2001 killing of N'deye Mareame Sarr or the 2011 killing of Christy Schwundeck).

=== Victim ===
Andreas "André" Borchardt was born on 5 January 1981 in Krasnodar, Russia, and immigrated to Germany with his mother in 1992. He was employed as a chemical worker. In 2008, Borchardt was sentenced to four-and-a-half years imprisonment for possession of cannabis. During his confinement, he completed a training course as a technician and was released in May 2013.

In early 2014, an acquaintance of Borchardt was arrested for attempting to sell three kilograms of marijuana. Arresting officers were aware of his relationship to Borchardt and an arrest warrant for multiple counts of drug dealing was issued for Borchardt on 1 March 2014. A house search of his residence at his parents' home on 2 April found no drugs except packaging for anabolic steroids. Despite this, Borchardt was never definitively proven to have returned to the drug trade.

== Shooting ==
On 25 July, two plainclothed officers were tasked with detaining Borchardt on suspicion of drug trafficking at an apartment complex on Herderstraße, where Borchardt's girlfriend lived. The initial arrest was delayed since the officers were ordered to serve as security at a football match between SV Wacker Burghausen and 1. FC Nürnberg II, but resumed shortly after when there were less fans than anticipated. Arriving back at around 17:30, police spotted Borchardt parking his red Audi roughly twenty minutes later and walking on the sidewalk adjacent to the building's backyard. The officers ran towards the suspect while identifying themselves as police officers. Borchardt turned his head towards them and ran away, turning a corner into the yard. A 35-year-old officer fired a warning shot in the air before shooting Borchardt in the neck from a distance between 6,50 and 10,20 metres. Borchardt was killed instantly and dropped to the ground, with the shooter's colleague checking for a pulse immediately after. Neither officer peformed first aid, reasoning that Borchardt was already dead. Six children, aged 6 to 15, were in the yard as well, most playing football. An ambulance was called at 18:02, which arrived 12 minutes later.

== Investigation ==
The officer who fired on Borchardt was initially suspended from duty and an investigation for negiligent homicide was ordered. The officer claimed that he had aimed for the man's legs and blamed the missed aim on experiencing issues with the gun, which was a replacement for his usual sidearm. An examination of the pistol found no defects. His colleague stated that the gunshot passed very closely by his own head.

According to a 15-year-old witness, the officer fired the fatal shot on Borchardt around a second after firing the warning shot. The mother of the deceased wanted the shooter to be tried in court for murder and hired lawyers Erhard Frank and Steffen Ufer. It was argued that lethal force should not have been used since firearms were only to be used in a non-immediate threat situation to "render persons unable to attack or flee" and that the location of an apartment complex with the visible presence of the children went against the rule that firearms were not allowed to be used if there was a reasonable risk for uninvolved bystanders.

In February 2016, the Traunstein prosecutor's office concluded that the officer had acted within law and that the death was "neither intentional or negligent", while also calling it an "absolutely isolated case".

== Aftermath ==
Six months after the killing, a Bavarian man was sued for insult by the officer who fired the fatal shots, after the latter read the comment section under an online Vice magazine article and found that the man referred to the officer as an "asocial jerk" ("asozialer Penner"). In May 2015, Munich's public prosecutor's office imposed a €1,200 fine.

Cannabis legalisation groups protested the killing as an example of excessive force while enforcing strict anti-marijuana laws. Memorial marches were held on the fifth and tenth anniversary of Borchardt's death.
