= Dubenec (Příbram District) =

- Municipality
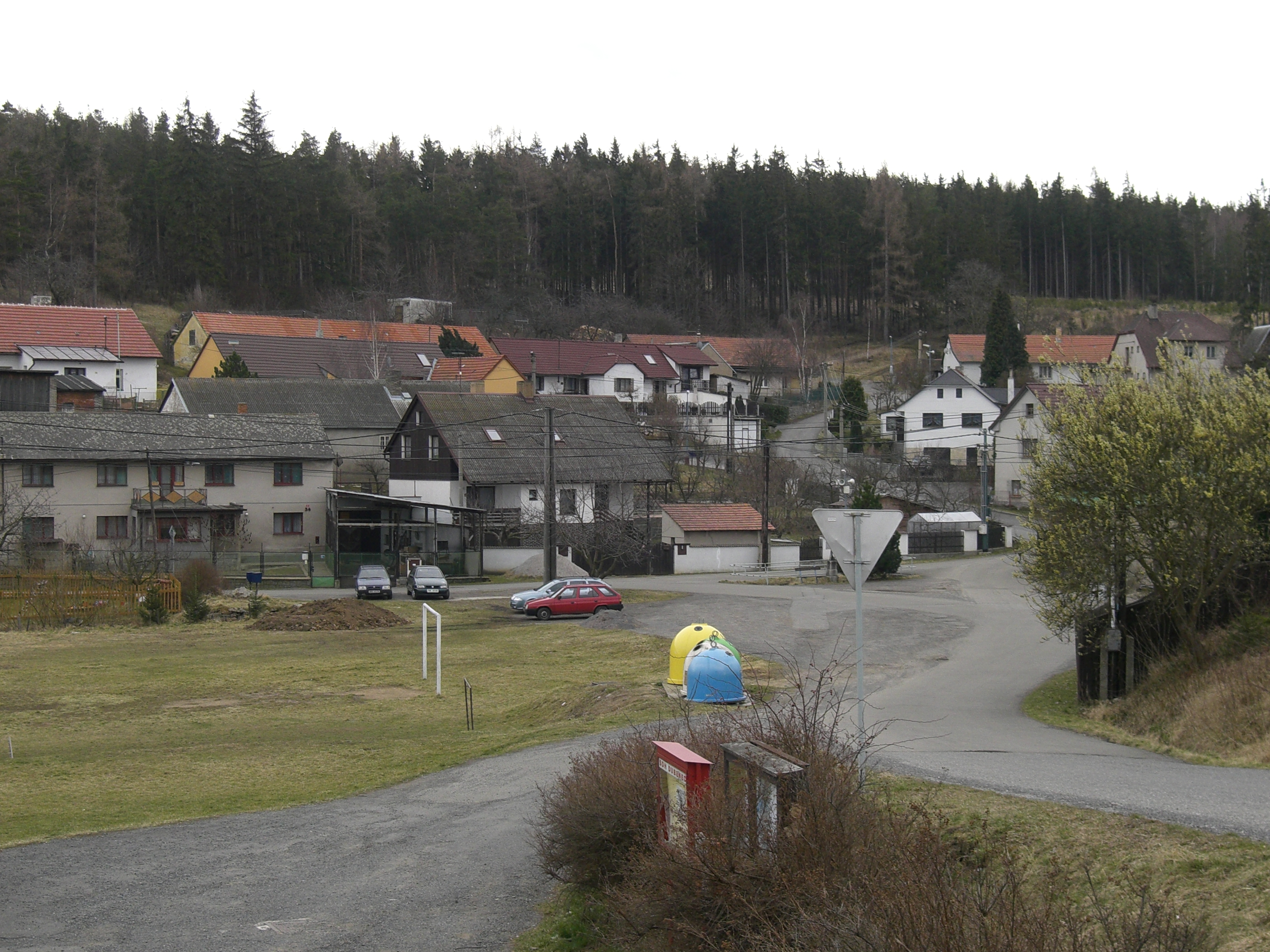
- Eastern part of Dubenec

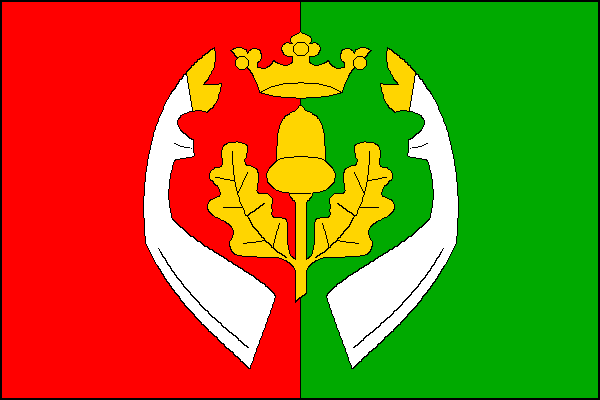
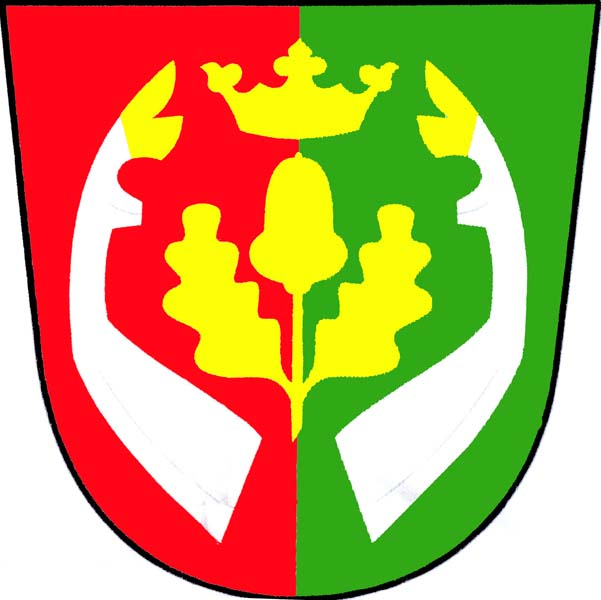
- Flag Coat of arms

- Location in the Czech Republic
- Coordinates: 49°41′45″N 14°4′45″E
- Country: Czech Republic
- Region: Central Bohemian
- District: Příbram
- First mentioned: 1321

Area
  - Total: 4.04 km^{2} (1.56 sq mi)
- Elevation: 458 m (1,503 ft)

Population (2026-01-01)
  - Total: 347
  - Density: 85.9/km^{2} (222/sq mi)
- Time zone: UTC+1 (CET)
  - Summer (DST): UTC+2 (CEST)
- Postal code: 261 01
- Website: www.obec-dubenec.cz

Dubenec is a municipality and village in Příbram District in the Central Bohemian Region of the Czech Republic. It has about 300 inhabitants.

== Demographics ==
Historical population
Year	Pop.	±%
1869	366	—
1880	384	+4.9%
1890	404	+5.2%
1900	385	−4.7%
1910	339	−11.9%
1921	324	−4.4%
1930	331	+2.2%
1950	272	−17.8%
1961	267	−1.8%
1970	292	+9.4%
1980	282	−3.4%
1991	221	−21.6%
2001	293	+32.6%
2011	1,251	+327.0%
2021	1,238	−1.0%
Source: Censuses
