= SEK (Germany) =

Police tactical units of each German state

Spezialeinsatzkommando
- Active: 1972–present
- Country: Germany
- Agency: Landespolizei (State police)
- Type: Police tactical unit
- Abbreviation: SEK

The Spezialeinsatzkommando (SEK, "Special Task Force") are police tactical units of each of the 16 German state police forces that specialize in a quick response with SWAT unit tactics to emergencies. Along with the Mobiles Einsatzkommando (MEK), Personenschutzkommando (bodyguards), and the Verhandlungsgruppe (negotiation teams in some states), they are part of the police Spezialeinheiten (special operations units) of each state force.

Mainly unrecognized by the media and public, the main missions of SEK units include providing paramilitary operations in urban areas, apprehension of armed and dangerous criminals, high-risk law enforcement situations, hostage rescue crisis management, serving of high-risk arrest warrants, supporting counterterrorism activities, and raids, as well as other scenarios like providing personal security details for VIPs or witnesses. Since the 1970s, each SEK has handled several thousand deployments. The front-runner is the SEK of the Berlin Police with up to 500 deployments a year, an average of 1.4 deployments a day.

The comparable unit of the German Federal Police is the GSG 9.

== History ==
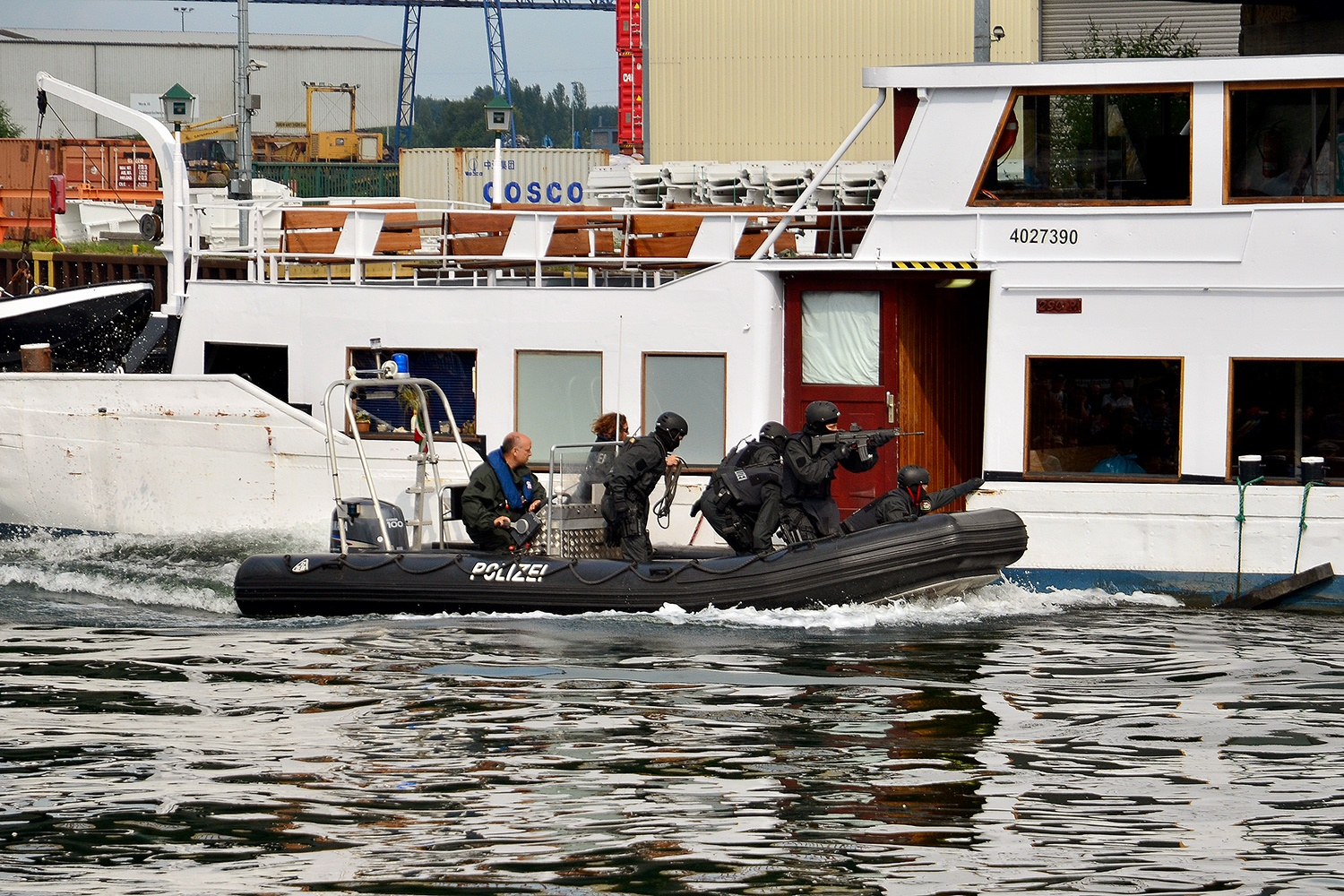
SEK operators raid a hijacked ship during a public exhibition.

It was in 1972 when the SEK and MEK units were established in the aftermath of the Munich Massacre. In 1974, the first SEK unit was raised in the state of North Rhine-Westphalia's police force.

After West and East Germany were unified in 1990, some ex-officers of the Diensteinheit IX (DIX) in the Volkspolizei were merged into the SEKs after thorough political evaluation procedures, such as with SEK units in Mecklenburg-Vorpommern and Sachsen-Anhalt.

The SEK received a name change from Sondereinsatzkommando to Spezialeinsatzkommando in 2013, because the former is usually associated with Sondereinsatzkommando Eichmann, a unit in the Nazi Schutzstaffel (SS) tasked with overseeing the deportation of Hungary's Jewish residents.

In 2015, the SEK was called in to intervene in Erfurt, Thuringia after a 48-year-old man barricaded himself in his apartment and acted violently towards emergency medical personnel. A SEK operative was wounded during the raid.

In 2015, the SEK Cologne was accused of harassment while performing an initiation ritual on a new member. These charges were later dropped. Ex-GSG9 commander Ulrich Wegener accused the SEK of being poorly disciplined since the officers were not punished. A Reichsbürgerbewegung supporter was confronted by the police in 2016 in Bavaria with the SEK deployed. One operative was shot dead after they were ordered to seize the man's weapons due to him being mentally unfit to handle them.

On June 10, 2021, Interior Minister for the state of Hesse Peter Beuth announced that its SEK unit in Frankfurt would be disbanded, as some of its operators were reported to be sharing alt-right messages.

== Organization ==
The organization of special police forces varies from state to state. Whilst most states have created one SEK which is based in their capital city, others have more than one. The North Rhine-Westphalia Police and Rheinland-Pfalz State Police have established SEKs in other major cities as needed. The Bavarian State Police and Hessen State Police both have two SEKs – one each for the north and the south.

Most SEKs have 40 to 70 operatives attached, depending on the state.

A SEK unit can be attached to the Bereitschaftspolizei riot police or to larger regional police headquarters. However, the common trend is to put the SEK units under the control of the Landeskriminalamt (State Criminal Investigation Office, LKA). Many LKA have special divisions which consist of the SEK, MEK and crisis negotiation teams.

The internal organisation of SEKs rests with the units and therefore differs as well.

The SEK of South Bavaria has an alpine component and the SEK units of Bremen and Hamburg have elements trained for maritime tasks. Some SEKs also have specialized negotiation groups (Verhandlungsgruppen, commonly abbreviated as VGs) for cases like hostage situations or suicide attempts.

== Eligibility and training ==
Any state police officer is eligible to apply for service in a SEK unit, but it is common only to consider applications from officers with at least three years of duty experience. The age limit is mostly between 23 and 35 years, whilst operatives have to leave the entry teams when they reach the age of 42 (or 45 in some states). Both sexes are eligible to apply.

At the moment, only the SEK units of Hamburg, (Note: The SEK-equivalent unit in Hamburg is also called MEK.) Schleswig-Holstein, and central Hesse have women in their ranks.

The requirements demand physical and mental strength, discernment, and capacity for teamwork. About 30 percent of all candidates pass the tests. The length of the training necessary to become an operative in a SEK unit differs but is generally five to eight months long and covers a wide range of required skills. Some training requires SEK operators to train with other police forces in Europe and North America.

All applications to join the SEK are made online. SEK operators usually get a stipend between 150 and 400 Euros, depending on the state police force where they work in.

== Equipment ==
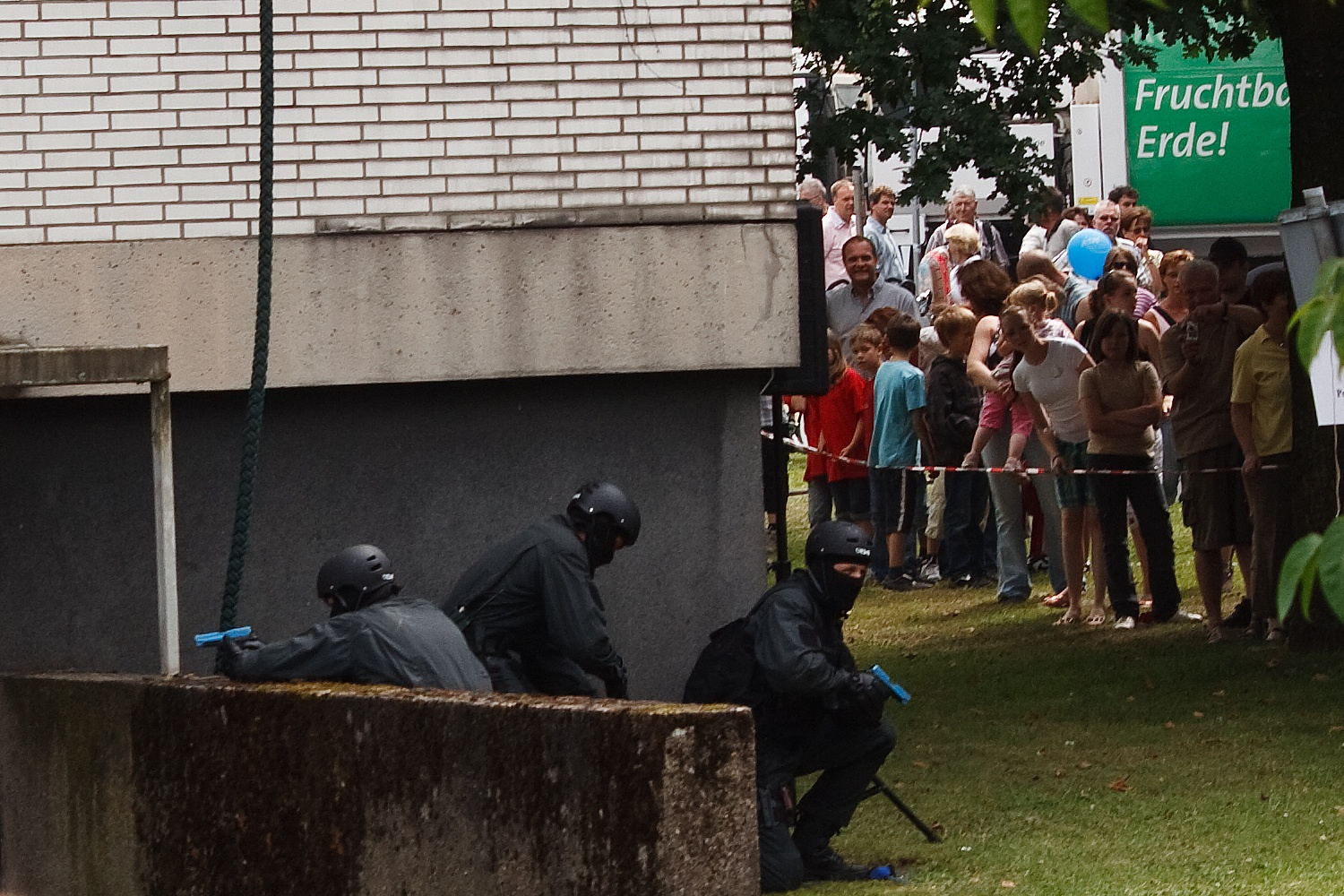
SEK operators practice assaulting a building, armed with training weapons.

While firearms are still issued by the forces, SEK officers can order equipment they feel are suited best for missions. The following weapons are used by SEK:

=== Weapons ===
Name	Country of origin	Type	Notes
Korth	Germany	Revolver	
Smith & Wesson Model 625	United States	Revolver	Used by Northrhine-Westphalia SEK operatives with suppressors
Glock 17	Austria	Semi-automatic pistol	Seen in use by Berlin SEK
Heckler & Koch VP9	Germany	Semi-automatic pistol	Seen in use by Saxony SEK
Heckler & Koch P30	Germany	Semi-automatic pistol	Used by Hesse State Police and Federal Police MFE (covert commando)
SIG P226	Germany	Semi-automatic pistol	
SIG P228	Germany	Semi-automatic pistol	
Heckler & Koch USP	Germany	Semi-automatic pistol	
Walther PDP	Germany	Semi-automatic pistol	Seen holstered during response to Wuppertal school stabbing by the Northrhine-Westphalia SEK
Heckler & Koch MP5	Germany	Submachine gun	
Heckler & Koch MP7	Germany	Submachine gun	
Heckler & Koch UMP	Germany	Submachine gun	
Heckler & Koch G36	Germany	Assault rifle	Used by Brandenburg SEK
Heckler & Koch G38	Germany	Assault rifle	14.5 inch-model used by Hesse State Police
FN SCAR	Belgium	Assault rifle	Mk 16 and Mk 17 variants used
Steyr AUG	Austria	Assault rifle	Used by Bavaria SEK
Haenel CR223	Germany	Assault rifle	Used by Hamburg SEKs/MEKs and Saxony SEKs
SIG Sauer MCX	United States	Assault rifle	
Remington 870	United States	Shotgun	
Mossberg 500	United States	Shotgun	
Heckler & Koch HK512	Germany	Shotgun	
Benelli M3	Italy	Shotgun	
Benelli M4	Italy	Shotgun	
Vepr-12	Russia	Shotgun	
Heckler & Koch PSG1	Germany	Sniper rifle	
Blaser R93 Tactical	Germany	Sniper rifle	
TPG-1	Germany	Sniper rifle	
DSR-Precision DSR-1	Germany	Sniper rifle	
Accuracy International Arctic Warfare	United Kingdom	Sniper rifle	
PGM Hécate II	France	Sniper rifle	

=== Vehicles ===
Name	Country of origin	Type	Notes
Ford F-550	United States	Pickup truck	Used by North Rhine-Westphalia SEK, modified with MARS tactical ladders.
RMMV Survivor R	Germany	MRAP	Used by Saxony Police SEK.
PMV Survivor I	Germany	MRAP	Used by Brandenburg State Police and the Hamburg Police use the PMV Survivor I for its SEK units.
LAPV Enok	Germany	SUV	Used by Bavarian State Police SEK.
Toyota Land Cruiser	Japan	SUV	Used by Saxony Police SEK, equipped with V8 engines.

== Uniforms ==
SEK members do not always operate in uniform but do wear masks to protect their identities, as well as to protect their bodies from burns. If cited in a trial they are only referred to by numbers.

When off-duty SEK officers are called to a crime scene, they may appear plain-clothed, only wearing their special protective gear and carrying their weapons.

== Related units ==
=== MEK ===
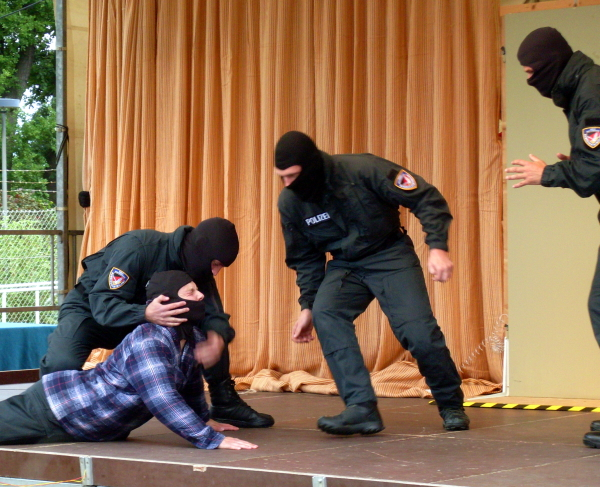
The MEK unit of the Federal Criminal Police Office during a demonstration

The Mobile Einsatzkommandos (MEK) or Mobile Task Force, operate hand-in-hand with the SEKs.

These plain-clothed units specialize in surveillance, quick arrests and mobile hostage sieges. They are used in investigations against organized crime, blackmailers or other serious offenses.

MEKs also provide close protection for a state's senior leaders, including the state's minister-president or interior minister. Requirements for duty as a MEK officer are similar but partially less strict than the requirements for the SEK.

== Images ==
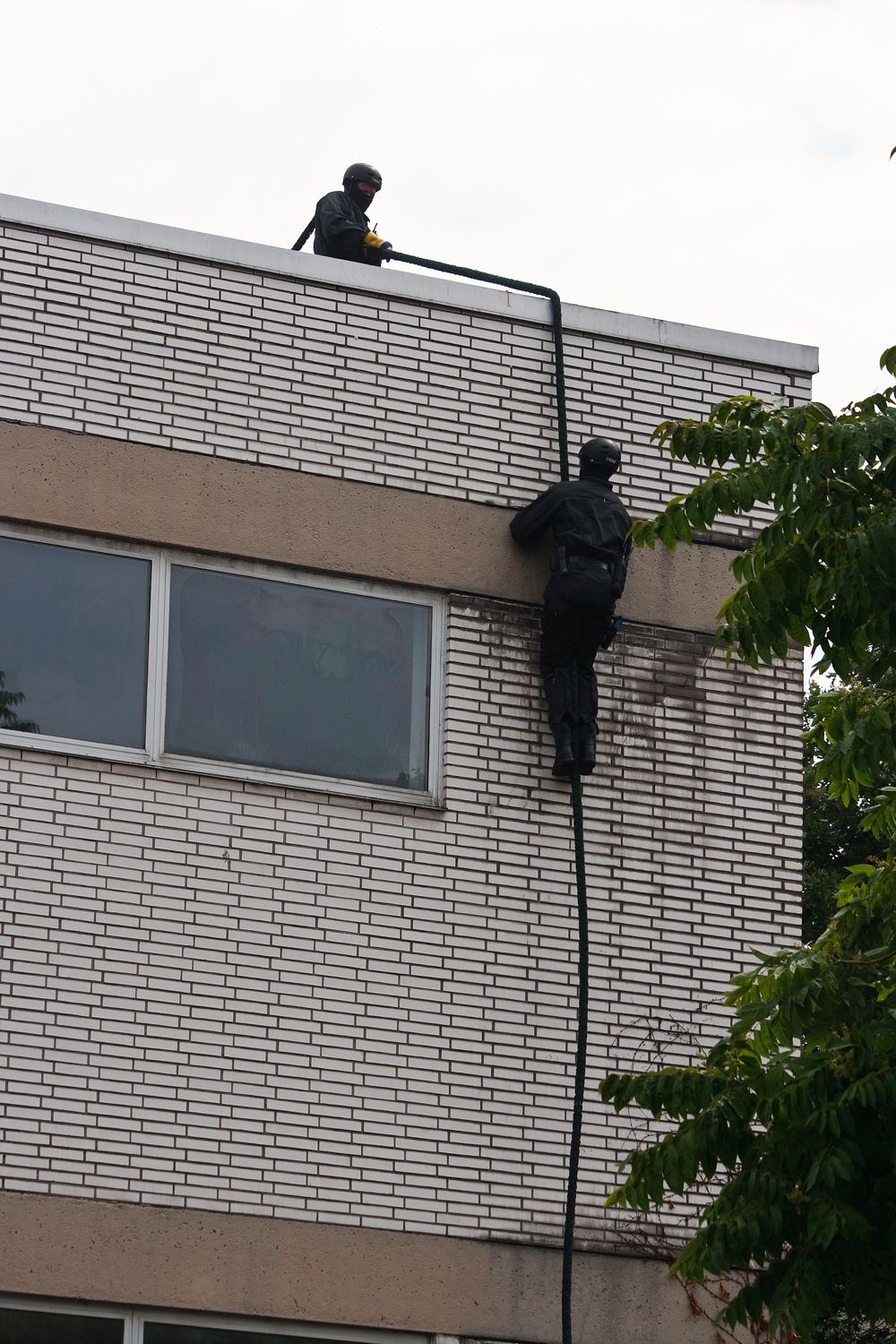

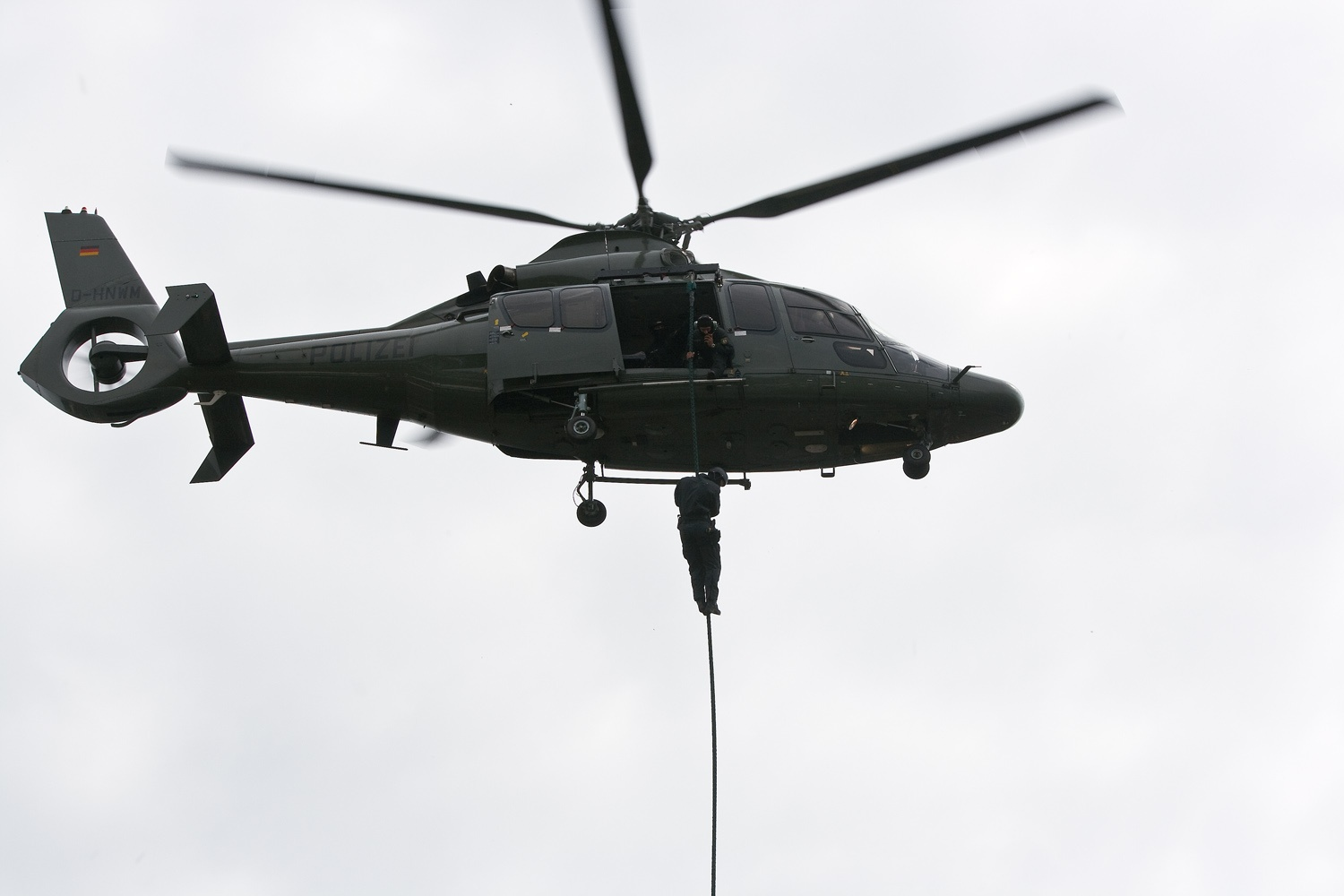

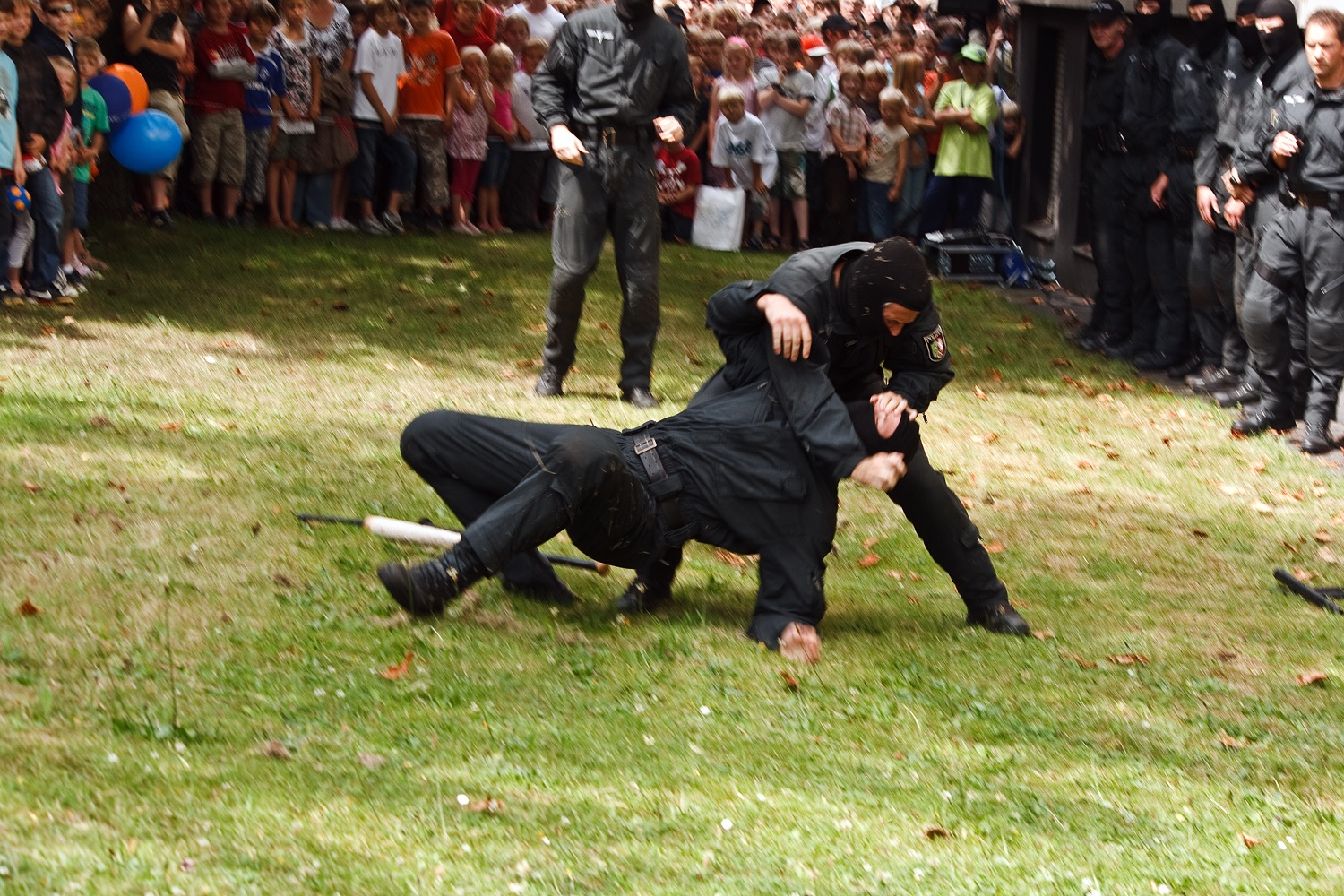

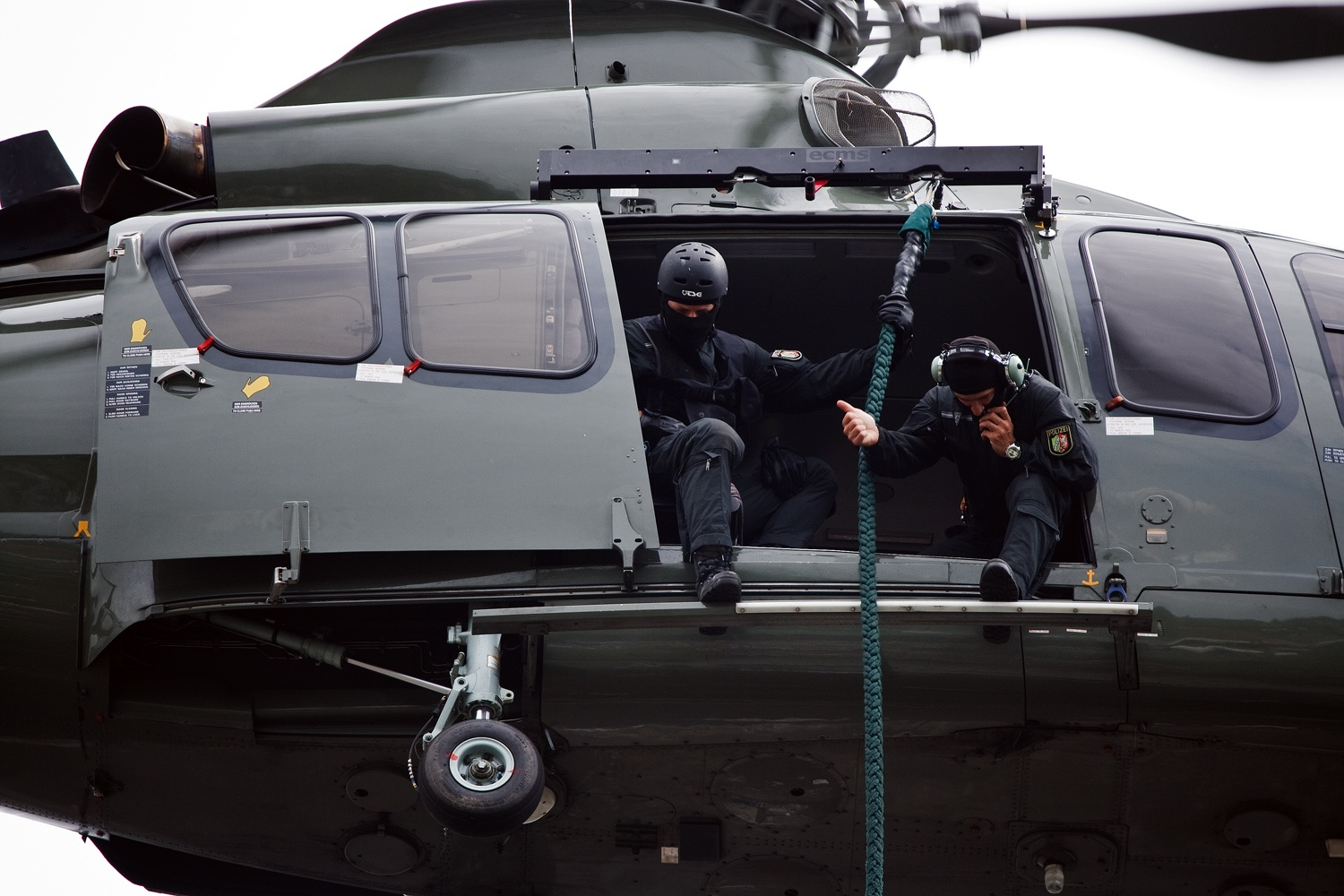

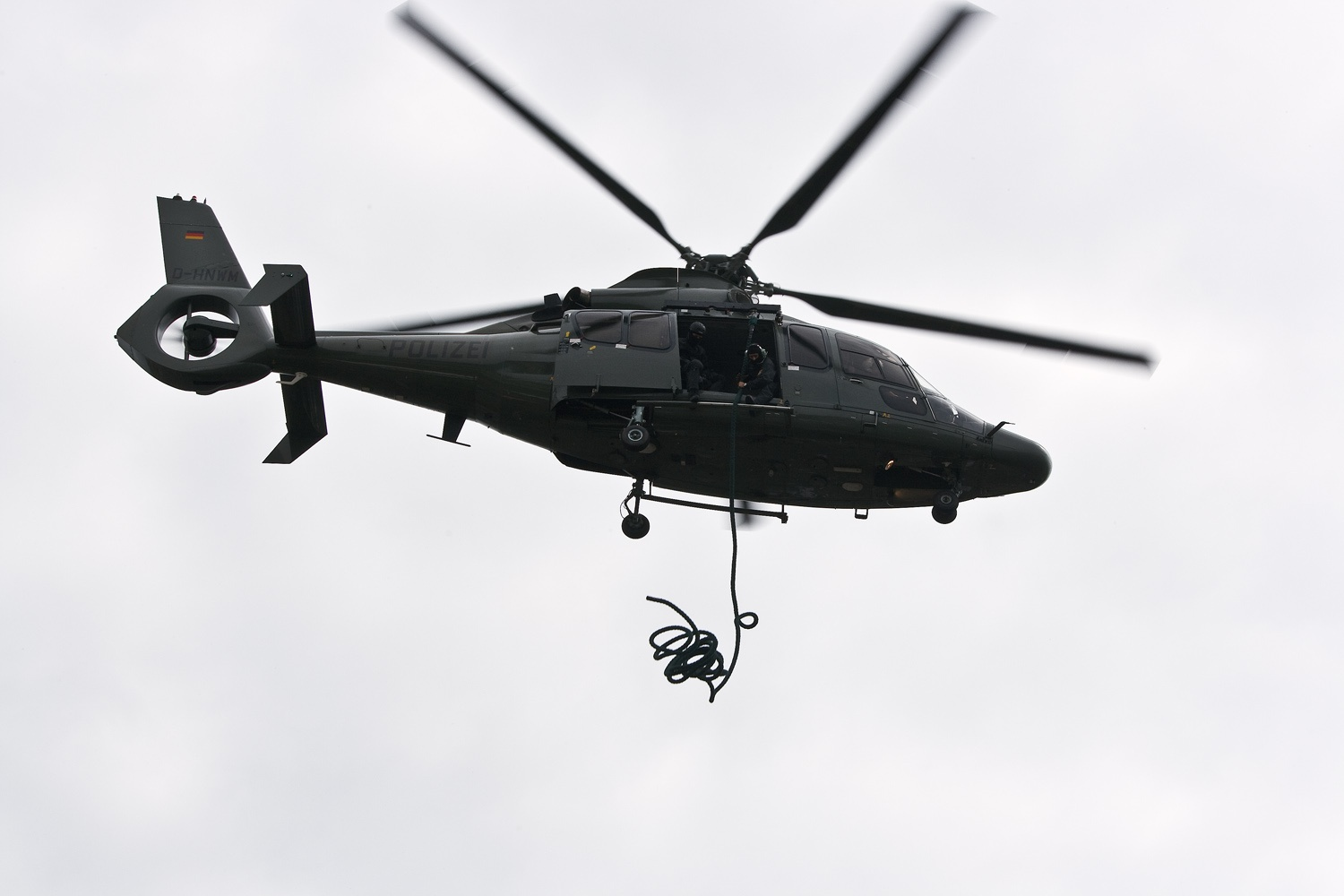

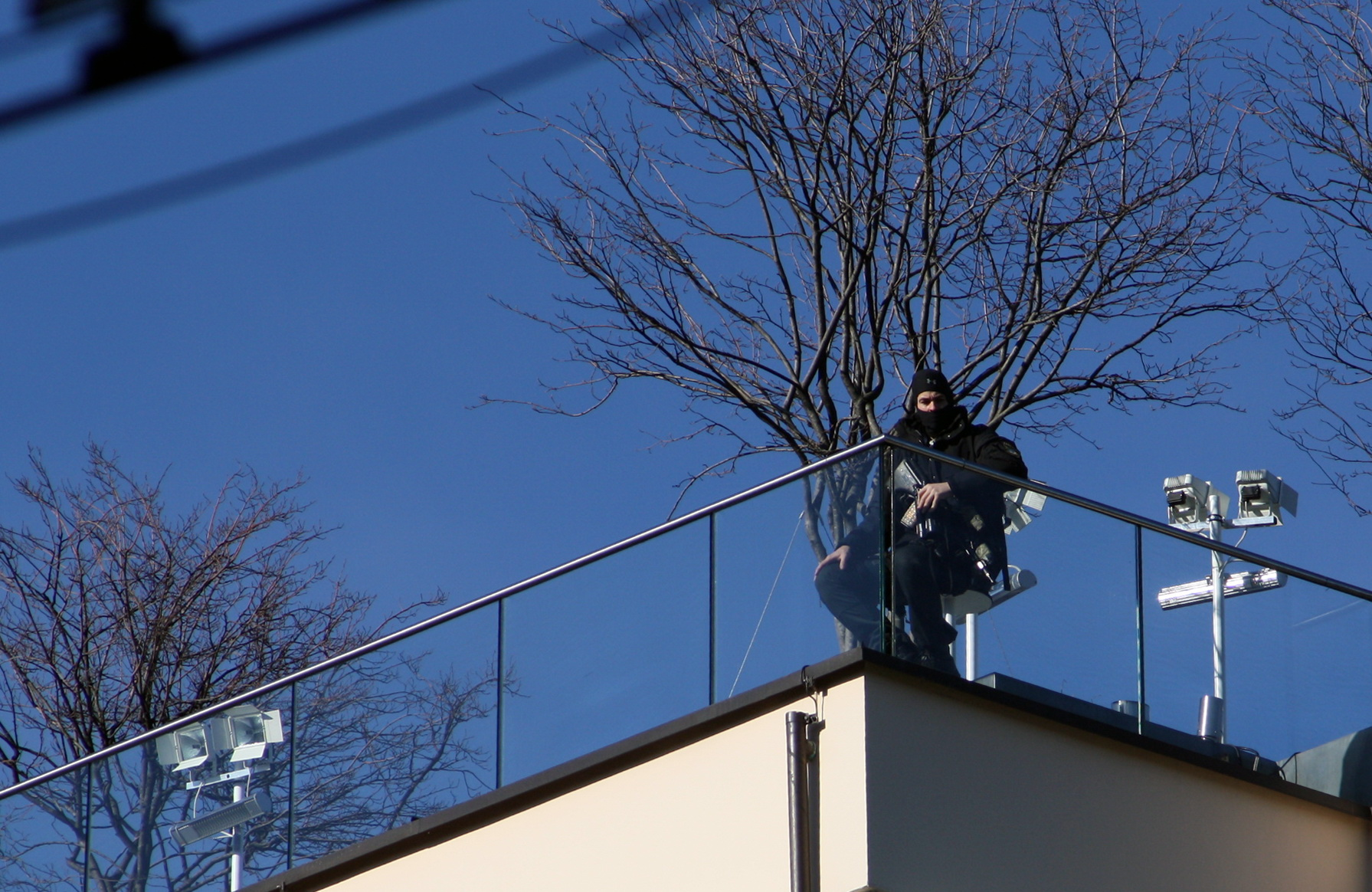

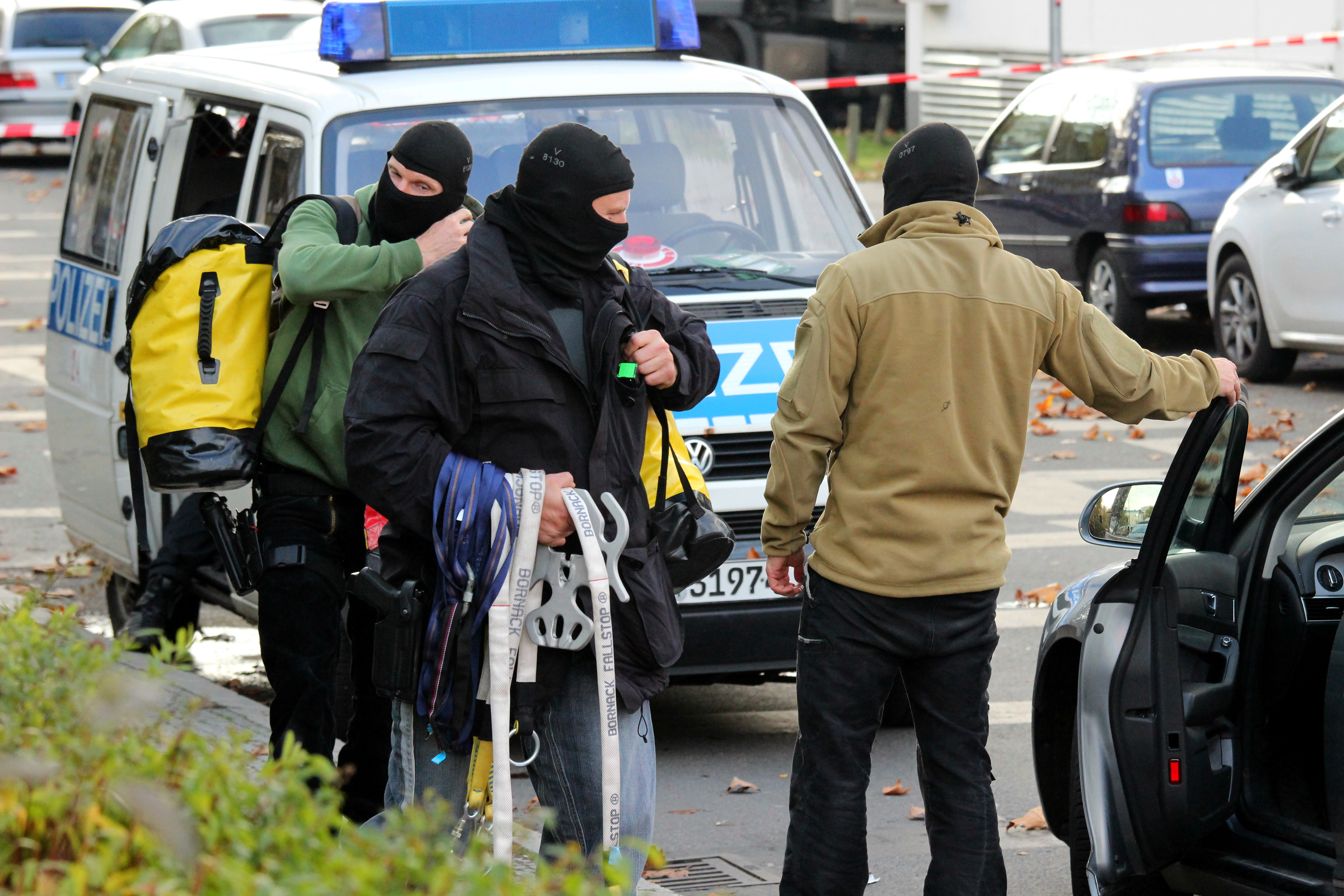

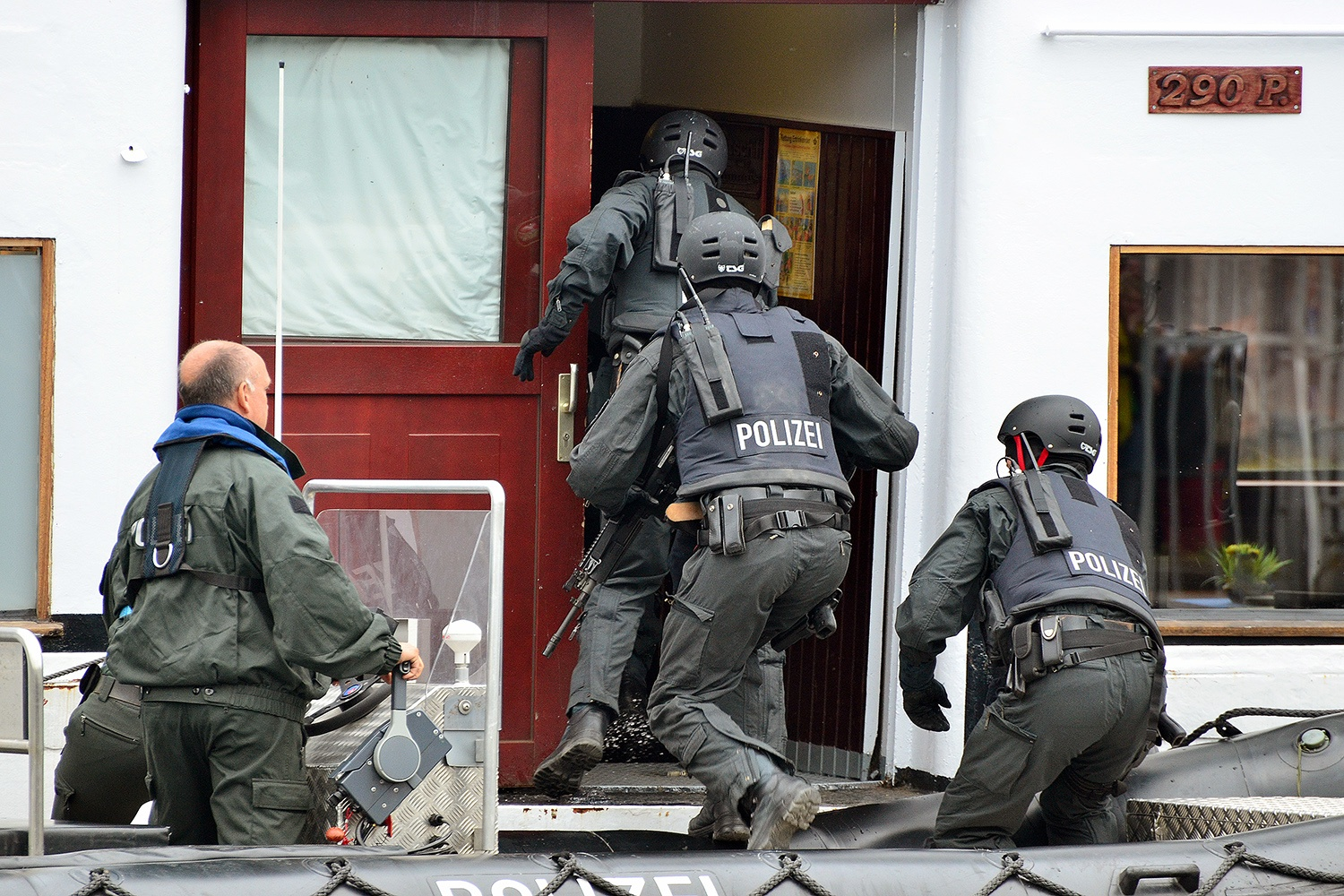

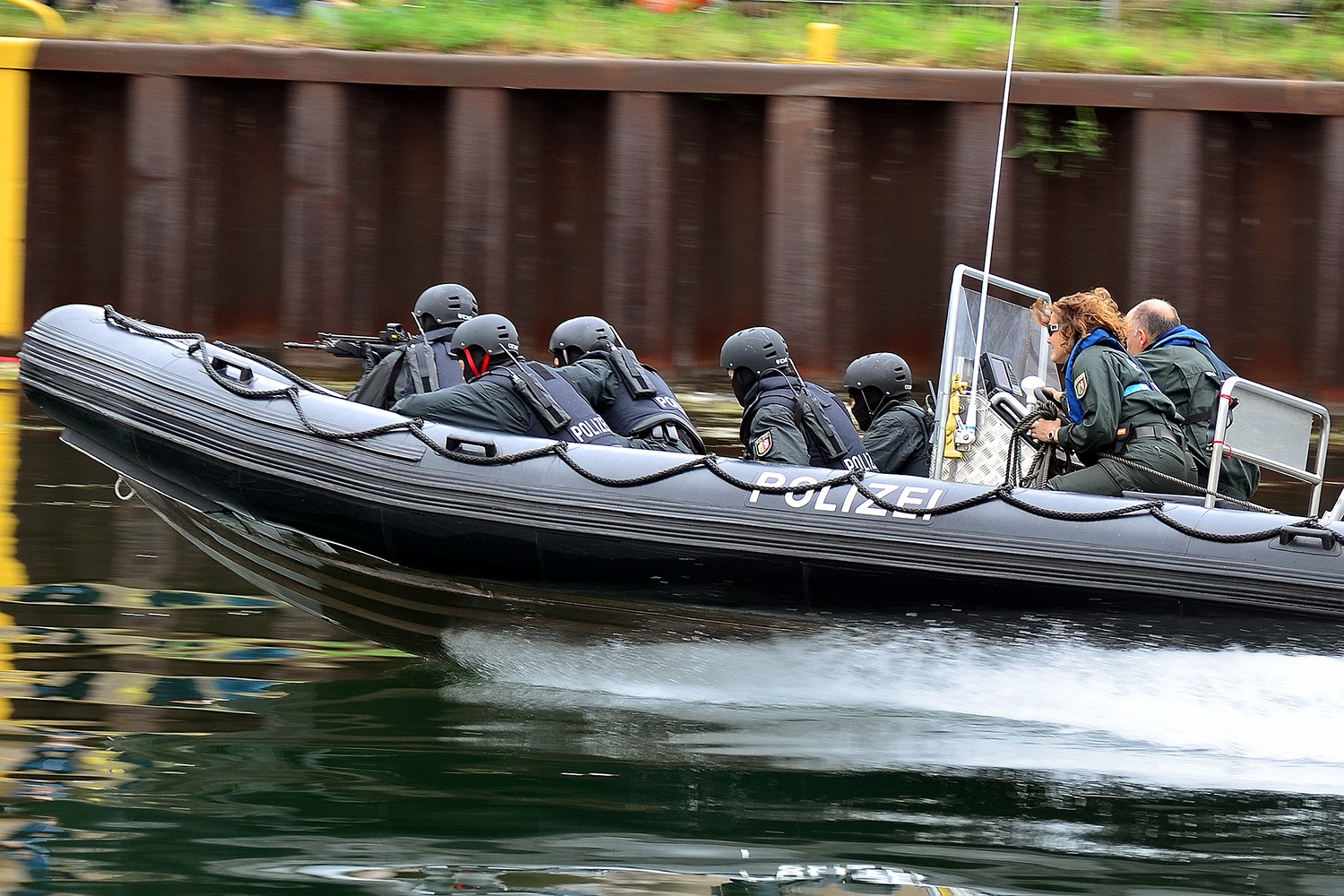

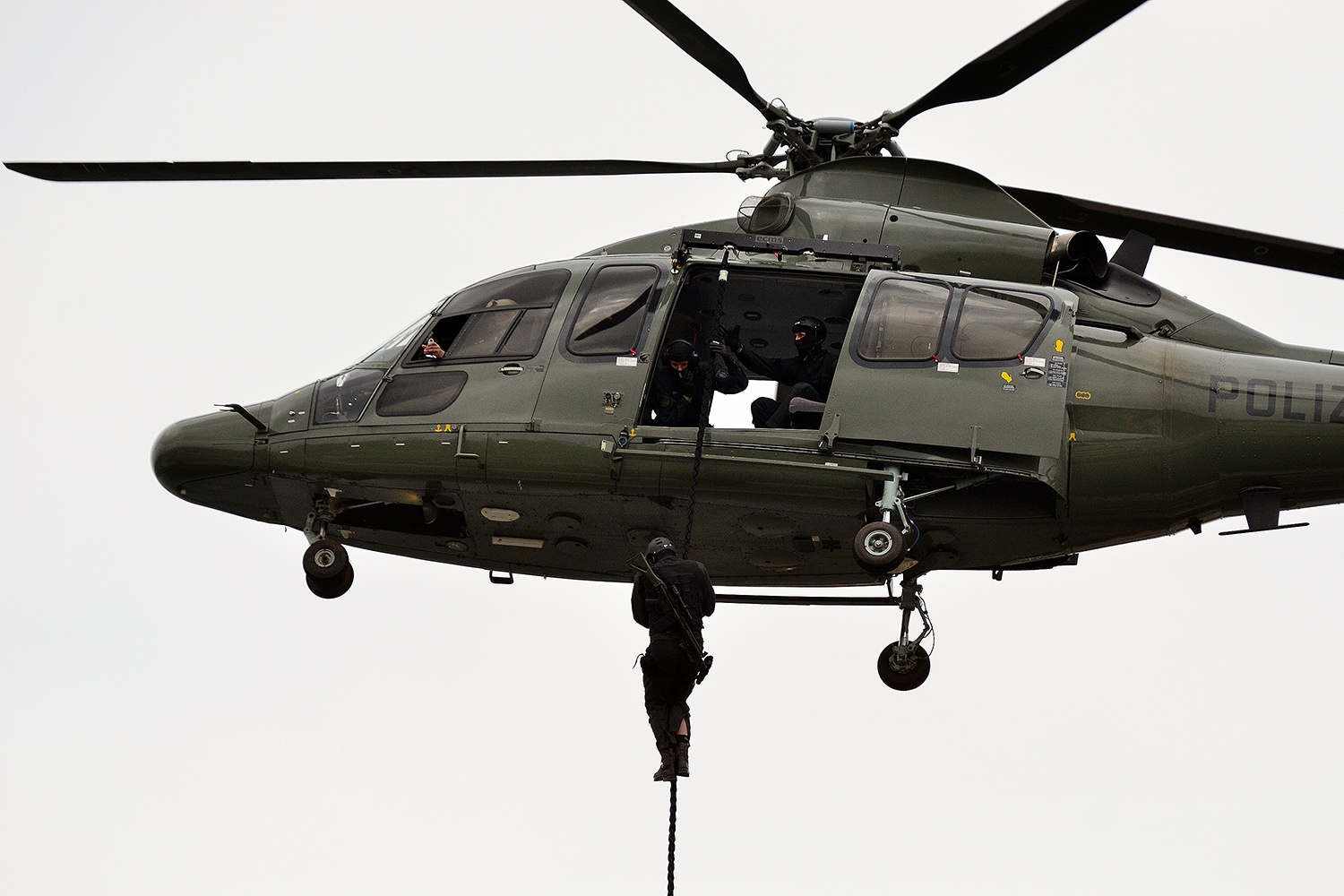

== Bibliography ==
- Tophoven, Rolf (1984). GSG 9: German response to terrorism. Bernard & Graefe Verlag. ISBN 978-3763750887.
