= Killing of Christy Schwundeck =

2011 killing in Frankfurt

- Date: 19 May 2011; 15 years ago
- Location: Frankfurt, Hesse, Germany
- Type: Homicide
- Deaths: 1

On 19 May 2011, Christy Schwundeck, a 39-year-old German citizen of Nigerian descent, was killed by police in Frankfurt-am-Main, Hesse, Germany. Schwundeck had refused to leave a job centre office after she was denied reimbursement for undelivered unemployment benefits and when the police arrived, a situation developed in which an officer shot her in the stomach, killing her. Her death provoked outrage internationally and led to allegations of racism against Frankfurt Police. The police officer was cleared of all charges on the grounds of self-defence.

== Early life ==
Christy Schwundeck (née Omorodion) was born on 1 June 1971 in Benin City, Nigeria, attended a nursing school there and immigrated to Germany for work in 1995. She received asylum status and lived in a government residence centre for a few years, but did not receive a work permit. She moved out of the home after entering a relationship with a German man, with whom she had a daughter. When her boyfriend ended the relationship and threw both Schwundeck and their daughter out, she worked as a cleaner and assembly line worker for a Nintendo manufacturing plant.

After Schwundeck was treated at a clinic for depression, Jugendamt took custody of her daughter and by the mid-2000s, Schwundeck had moved to Aschaffenburg, where she had a job as a kitchen helper for a restaurant. In 2008, she married a German man in Sønderborg, Denmark, taking his last name. Schwundeck became a German citizen on 11 October 2008. Schwundeck became frustrated by her lack of steady employment and suffered a sharp mental decline after a court denied Schwundeck rights to see her daughter. In late 2010, Schwundeck was mugged during a walk in the park and later on, a man attacked her on the street while shouting racist expletives. Her marriage broke down in 2010, although she remained friends with her ex-husband, and in November of the same year, she moved to Frankfurt.

== Incident ==
Early on the morning of 19 May 2011, Schwundeck called her ex-husband in distress because the previous week she had applied to the job centre for financial assistance and received no reply. He advised her to go to the centre to ask for an advance. At 08:30, she went to the job centre on Mainzer Landstraße. She received benefits under the Hartz IV system but she had not received the latest installment on 1 May and had no money. She had previously received emergency cash at job centres in Aschaffenburg and Wiesbaden, as was legally mandated. In order to get to the centre, she was forced to travel on the train without a ticket. At the centre, she entered room 22 and asked for 10 euros in cash so she could buy food. The advisor refused to give her money and she decided to stay seated, leading to the security being called. The deputy team leader also became involved; he offered Schwundeck a food voucher which would be equivalent to her benefits in June, which she did not want to take. She continued to sit in her seat.

At 08:50, Frankfurt police received a call from the job centre saying that a woman was making trouble and refusing to leave. Two officers (one male, one female) parked outside the centre at 09:01 and went inside, finding four people in room 22, namely the advisor, the deputy team leader, a security guard and Christy Schwundeck. Schwundeck was still sitting on her seat with her bag on the table beside her. One officer asked her for identification and she put her hand inside the bag, but did not produce any identification. When the male officer took her bag, she used a steak knife to stab him in his arm and belly. The female officer retreated to the door of the room and pulled her gun. She shouted, "Lass das Messer fallen, oder ich schieße!" ('Drop the knife, or else I'll shoot!') When Schwundeck did not comply, she shot her. The female officer later stated that Schwundeck "had a totally crazy look, full of aggression, hatred and anger".

Schwundeck was shot in the stomach and died from her injuries. It was later recorded that she tested negative for drugs and had nothing in her stomach except a greenish-brownish liquid, with nine eurocents in her wallet. At the time of her death, she was 39.

== Juridical process ==
In January 2012, the public prosecutor dropped the case against the female police officer, on the grounds that she had acted in self-defence. The prosecutor said that Schwundeck had run towards the female police officer, putting her in fear of her life. He said that use of pepper spray or a warning shot was impracticable in a small room. In March 2012, Der Spiegel reported that Schwundeck's brother and her ex-husband had made a legal complaint to the Public Prosecutor General which demanded a trial of the officer.

== Legacy ==
The death of Schwundeck shocked the African diaspora. Claudia Czernohorsky-Grüneberg, head of Frankfurt's job centres, told the Hessenschau television programme that the request for 10 euros was legitimate. In an interview with T-Online, Siraad Wiedenroth (director of Initiative Schwarze Menschen) noted that the time between the police being called and the death of Schwundeck was less than an hour.

In 2019, demonstrators commemorated the deaths which they claimed had been caused by the Hartz IV system outside the Federal Constitutional Court, whilst the sanctions were being challenged. Black Lives Matter protestors in Germany drew links between the death of Schwundeck and other deaths in police custody such as those of Ousman Sey, Dominique Koumadio, Slieman Hamade and N'deye Mareame Sarr. Connections were also drawn with the death of Oury Jalloh.

At a memorial event in Frankfurt in 2021 which marked ten years since the death of Schwundeck, a representative of the Initiative Christy Schwundeck blamed the events on "deadly institutional racism".

== See also ==
- Death of Achidi John
