= Squatting in Hamburg =

Social movement in Hamburg, Germany

The modern political squatting movement began in Hamburg, Germany, when Neue Große Bergstraße 226 was occupied in 1970. Squatters wanted to provide housing for themselves amongst other demands such as preventing buildings from being demolished and finding space for cultural activities. The Hafenstraße buildings were first occupied in 1981 and were finally legalized after a long political struggle in 1995. The still extant Rote Flora self-managed social centre was occupied in 1989. Squatting actions continue into the present; more recent attempts are quickly evicted, although the Gängeviertel buildings were squatted and legalized in the 2010s.

== 1970s ==
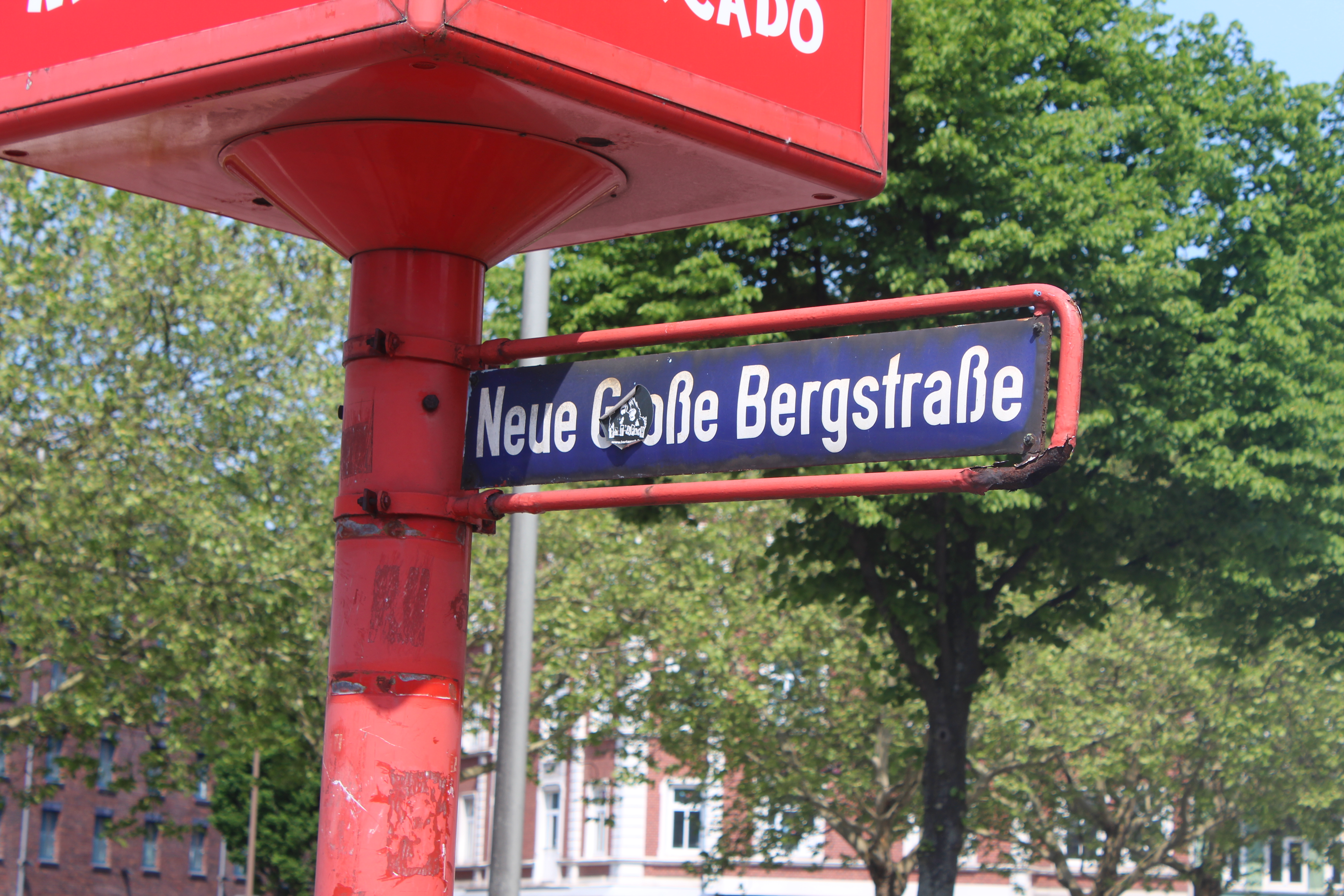
Neue Große Bergstraße

On 6 October 1970, thirty hippies squatted a derelict hotel on Neue Große Bergstraße 226 in Hamburg. They were immediately evicted by police and then the owner decided to rent out rooms to them for 60 Deutsche Marks each until the building was demolished. The hippies were again evicted by the police one month later on the grounds that petty crime in the area had increased and then occupied a house at Funkstrasse 18 in Altona.

Students squatted two houses in the Karolinenviertel in December and were evicted a day later. The Siechenhauses in St. Georg was occupied for four days and then evicted. The University of Hamburg owned buildings at Schlump in the borough of Eimsbüttel. It demolished some but was prevented from knocking down the Schröderstift building by a student occupation in 1971. A tenants group was formed and made a deal with the city council, which also wanted to preserve the monumental building.

In 1973, Der Spiegel reported that around 60 squatters had barricaded themselves inside Ekhofstrasse 39, in the Hohenfelde district. Participants had come from Berlin, Bremen and Frankfurt; the police and the owner decided not to react, hoping that the protest would dwindle. The squatters were students, workers and members of the Proletarian Front (Proletarischen Front) who wanted to provide themselves with housing. Karl-Heinz Dellwo took part in the Ekhof occupation and later joined the Red Army Faction. The occupation of Haynstraße 1–3 in 1975 was carried out by existing tenants and therefore was not strictly squatting, but the building was linked to the squatters movement and has resisted speculators for over forty years.

== 1980s ==
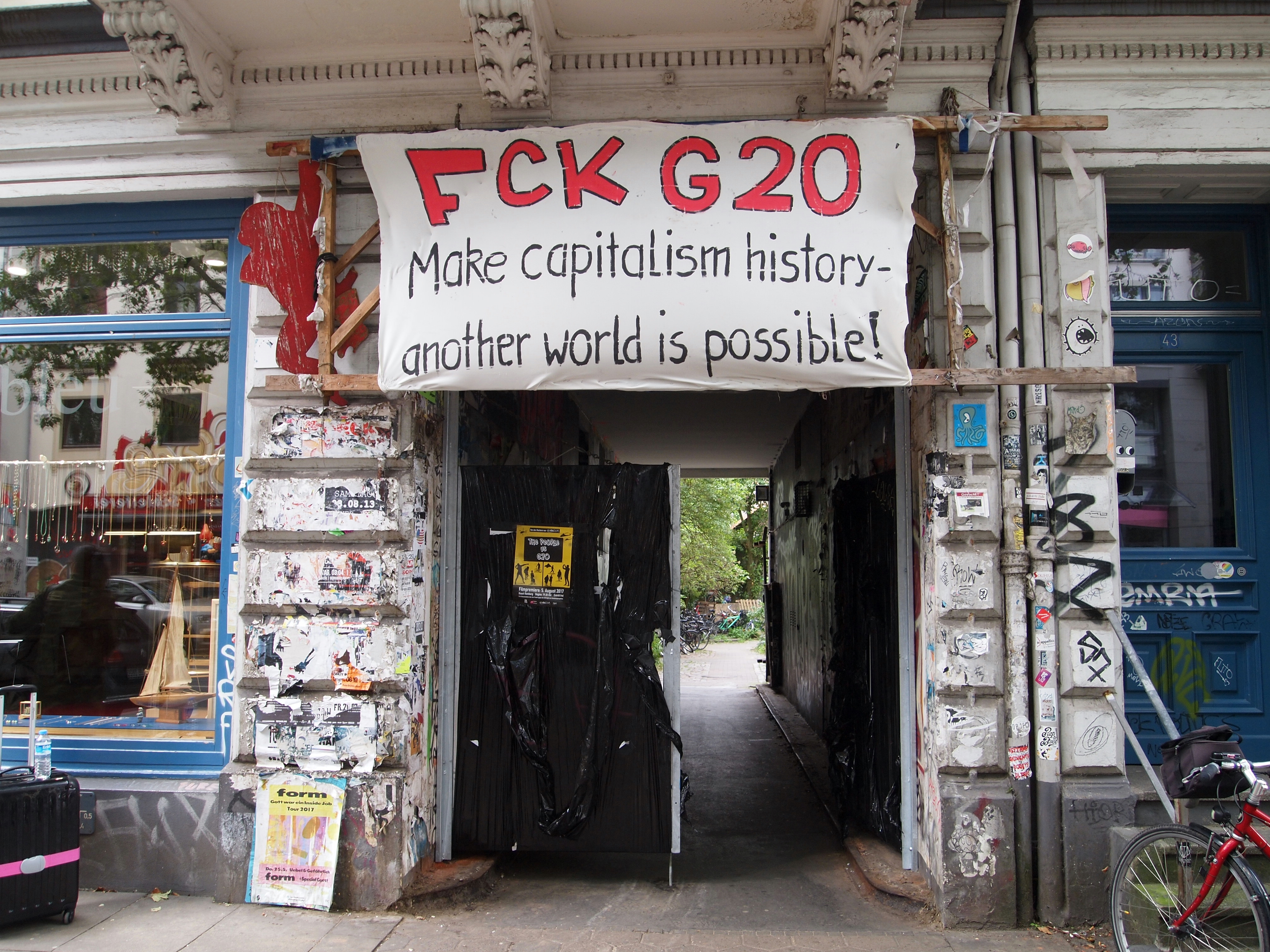
Schanzenstraße 41a

During the 1980s, a squatters movement existed in Hamburg and had links to Berlin and also Amsterdam. In order to prevent its growth, the state minister Alfons Pawelczyk decided that no squat in Hamburg would be permitted to last longer than 24 hours and thus many attempts at occupation were quickly evicted.

In 1983, the Hamburger Abendblatt recorded that 57 squatters had been arrested and were on trial for occupying a former police station at Billstedt in Hamburg-Mitte, the previous year. The squatters were fined. Amongst the arrestees was a Grün-Alternative Liste Hamburg (GAL) politician.

Schanzenstraße 41a was occupied in 1987, the first of many squats in the then run-down area of Sternschanze. The squat was legalized and a housing co-operative was set up to run the 50 apartments. In 2007, the police attempted to storm the co-operative during the Asia–Europe Meeting after riots in the local district. Whilst doing so, 170 police officers tear gassed themselves by accident.

In 1989, Kleiner Schäferkamp 46a was squatted and evicted the same day. The building was later reoccupied and became legalized as a housing project, with an infoshop on the ground floor called Schwarzmarkt. In 2019, the project complained that the police had illegally set up a hidden camera to monitor the house from across the street.

=== Hafenstraße ===
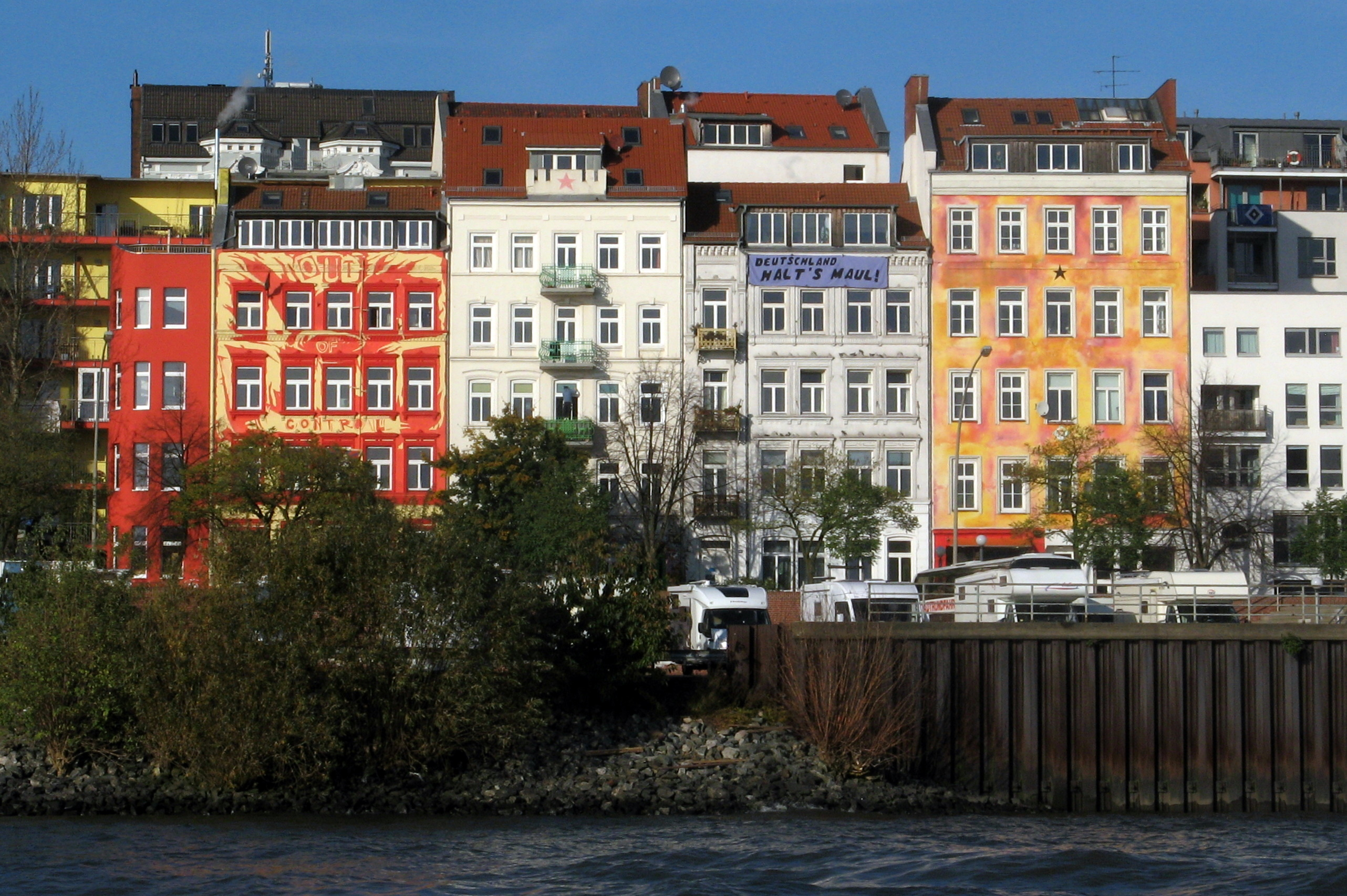
Hafenstraße

The Hafenstraße occupation began in 1981, when twelve buildings were squatted. They were to become extremely important symbols for the German squatters movement and for urban activists more generally. The squatters then signed a three-year temporary use contract and argued they should be permitted to restore the buildings themselves. This led to conflict with the city council which repeatedly attempted to evict them. In the 1980s, Hafenstraße became a centre for autonomist and anti-imperialist politics.

In November 1987, a contract was signed at the last minute and the barricades were dismantled. Dohnanyi later received the Theodor Heuss medal for avoiding conflict. He had previously described Hafenstraße as a "wound in the city" ("eine Wunde in der Stadt"). In February 1995, the Hamburg Senate finally decided to sell the remaining houses to the inhabitants for around 2 million Deutsche Marks. The co-operative Alternativen am Elbufer (Alternatives beside the Elbe) took on the ownership. In 1998, The Independent newspaper referred to Hafenstraße as "the most famous squat in the world".

=== Rote Flora ===
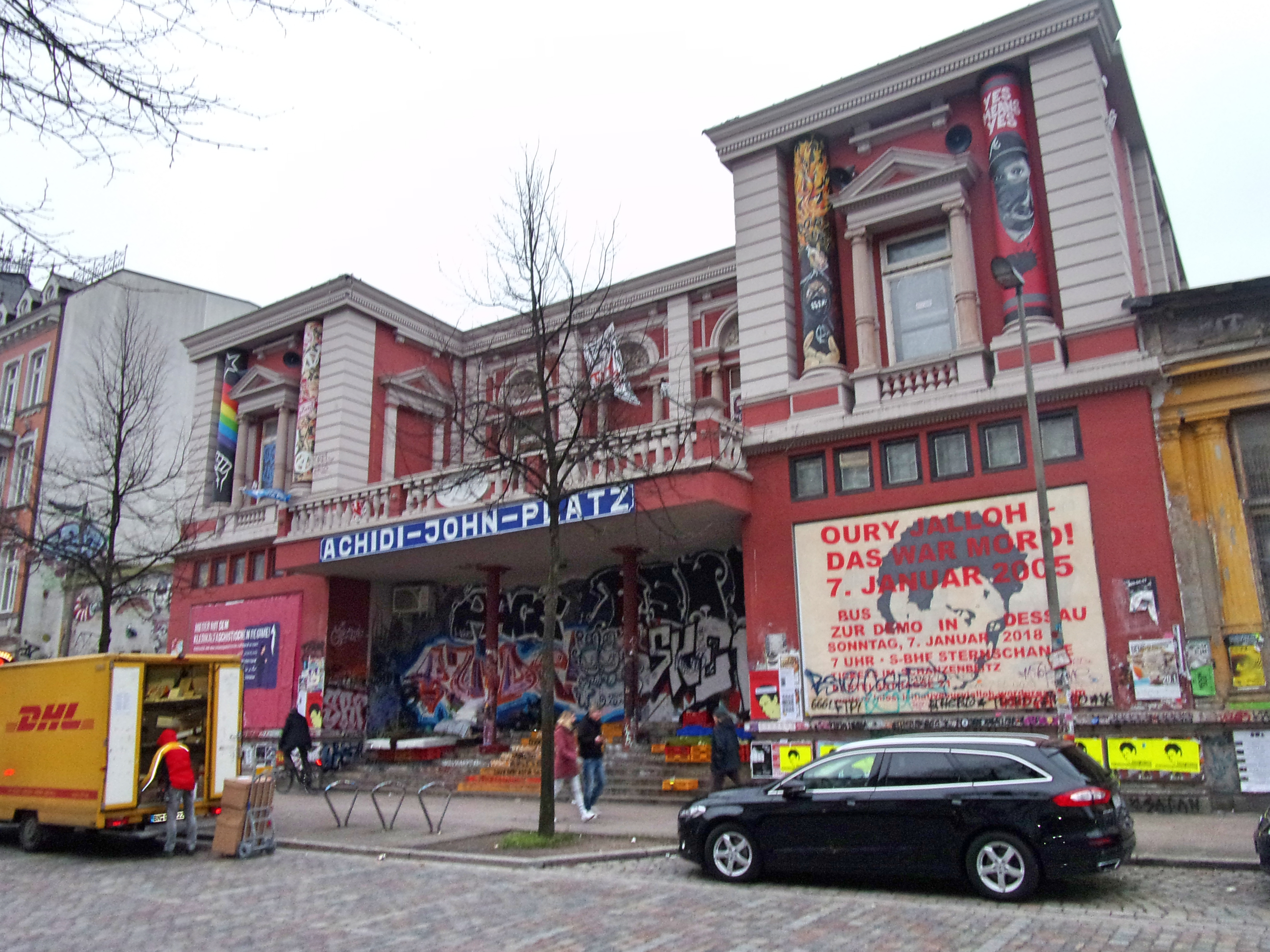
Rote Flora

The Rote Flora was squatted on 1 November 1989 and has remained squatted ever since. At the beginning the occupiers were very much focused on local struggles and as time went by, the Rote Flora has developed into a self-managed social centre connected to left-wing, anarchist activism, with links to similar projects in Amsterdam, Berlin and Copenhagen. The building provides a music venue, an infoshop, a social movement archive, a bar, a cafe, rehearsal rooms and a bicycle repair workshop. Following riots in the Schanzeviertel during the 2017 G20 Hamburg summit, right-wing commentators demanded that the Rote Flora was closed down. The Rote Flora distanced itself from the rioters, with a spokesperson saying: "that a form of militancy was brought onto the streets which was intoxicated with itself, and we find that both politically and in terms of content wrong" ("dass hier eine Form von Militanz auf die Straße getragen wurde, die sich selbst berauscht hat und das finden wir politisch und inhaltlich falsch").

== 2000s ==
=== Gängeviertel ===
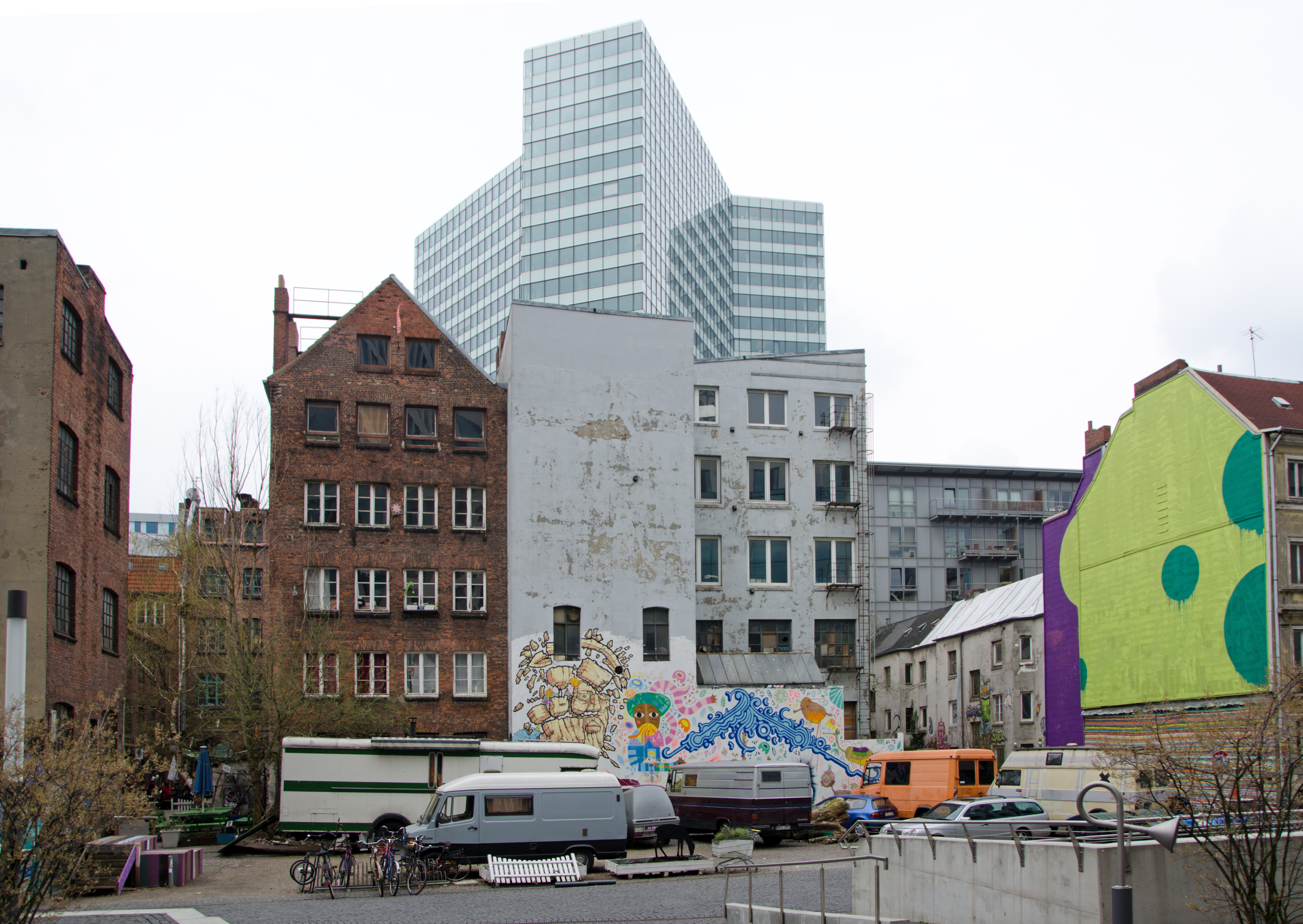
Gängeviertel

In 2003, a Dutch investor bought some dilapidated buildings in the city centre, planning to redevelop them. Six years later, a group of 200 squatters (mainly artists) occupied twelve buildings in the Gängeviertel and argued that the city should develop the buildings itself and preserve the area's character. The city bought back the area in 2010 and the following year acceded to the squatters' demands. The parties resolved to share the costs of restoration, which were estimated to be 20 million euros.

== Recent ==
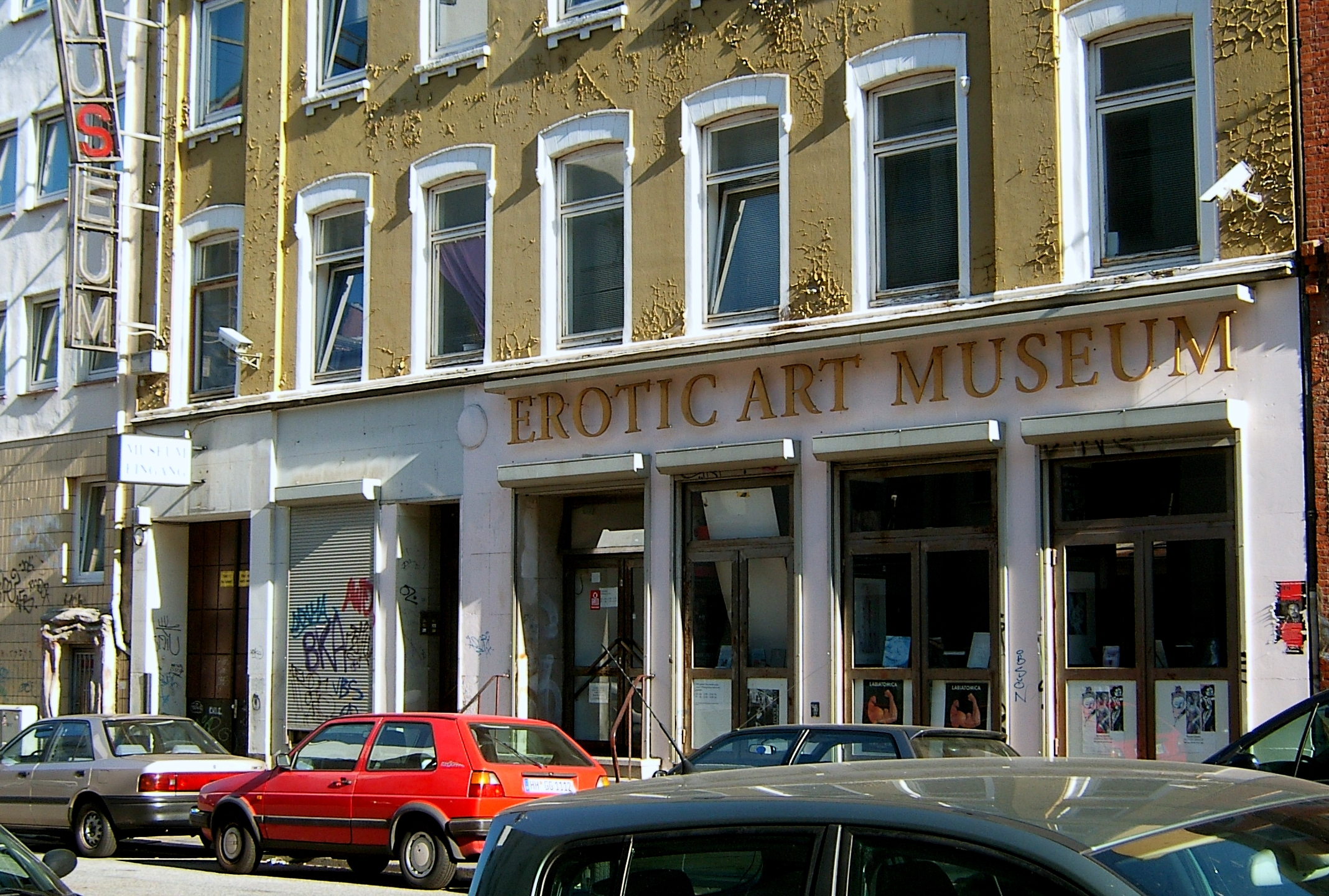
The Erotic Art Museum on Bernhard-Nocht-Straße, in 2006

After events in the European migrant crisis such as the 2013 Lampedusa migrant shipwreck, squats and social centres have mobilised to support migrants in Hamburg. People from the Lampedusa in Hamburg group cook at the Hafenstraße Volxküche. New occupations tend to be quickly evicted. Squatters at the former Erotic Art Museum on Bernhard-Nocht-Straße were evicted on the same night the place was occupied in 2010. As part of the Squatting Days festival in 2014, a house on Breiten Straße was briefly squatted.

== See also ==
- 2013–2014 Hamburg demonstrations
