= Killing of N'deye Mareame Sarr =

2001 killing in Germany

On 14 July 2001, 26-year-old N'deye Mareame Sarr (also spelled Ndéye Marième Sarr), a German citizen of Senegalese background, was shot dead by a police officer in Aschaffenburg, Bavaria, Germany. Her killing was announced by the police as an act of self-defence, whereas black German organizations saw it as murder.

== Background ==
N'deye Mareame Sarr and her German husband had been separated and were embroiled in a custody dispute over their two-year-old son. In early July 2001, her husband successfully requested sole custody, with Sarr allegedly not being informed of this and instead told that the child would be temporarily left in the care of her husband's parents in Cologne. When Sarr called her mother-in-law to demand access to her son, the mother-in-law told her of her husband's decision and called her a racial slur. For several days, Sarr made complaints to police, accusing her husband of kidnapping their son, which were dismissed since the court had already decided in the matter.

== Killing ==
On the night of 14 July 2001, at around 2:30, Sarr went to her husband's house in Aschaffenburg to confront him about his plans. According to the police report, she forced her way into the house and when she refused to leave, her ex-husband called the police. Two police officers arrived and attempted to usher Sarr out of the home. The police report stated that Sarr ran into the kitchen and grabbed a bread knife, which she used to stab an officer who had followed after her. The officer deflected the motion with his radio, instead getting a cut to the wrist. The other officer shouted a warning to drop the weapon and fired one shot at her, striking Sarr in the shoulder. The round fractured her clavicle and bone shards pierced a vital artery. She died shortly after at a hospital.

== Reactions ==
Organizations such as the Black Students Organization (BSO), the African Refugees Association (ARA) and Struggles of Students (SOS) disputed the police account, asking why two officers were unable to calm Sarr down using other methods. The police statement was criticised for using language that described Sarr as "physically imposing compared to her husband" and as having For them, the killing was murder and because Sarr had a Senegalese background they saw a racist element to her death. The groups also questioned why Sarr's mother was not permitted to see the corpse and why the police officer who killed her had not been suspended.

Jungle World newspaper suggested that Sarr died because the police were using newly introduced Polizei-Einsatz-Patrone (PEP) bullets, a form of expanding bullet designed to cause maximum damage to the person who was shot. The Bavarian Ministry of the Interior rejected this interpretation of events.

== Legacy ==
Sarr's death has been linked to other deaths of black Germans in custody such as Slieman Hamade, Oury Jalloh, Dominique Koumadio, Christy Schwundeck and Ousman Sey.
