= Death of Ousman Sey =

Ousman Sey was a 45-year-old man from Gambia living in the Nordstadt district of Dortmund in Germany. On 7 July 2012, Ousman Sey began to feel pains in his chest at his house in Dortmund, Germany. He called the emergency services and they told him he did not need to go to hospital. Becoming agitated, he broke a window in his apartment, causing a neighbour to call the police. When the police arrived, he complained about his chest pains; paramedics again said he did not need to go to hospital. He was then arrested and detained. He later died in police custody.

Sey's death caused controversy since questions were immediately raised about why a man complaining of chest pain was not taken more seriously. A demonstration was organised in Dortmund and his family suggested there were racist motives for not helping Sey. The police denied racism was part of their decision-making but links were drawn by protestors to other deaths in police custody suspected to be racially motivated such as those of Laya-Alama Condé, Oury Jalloh and Achidi John. Nine months after the incident, the public prosecutor announced the files on the case were closed and no action would be taken against anyone involved.
