= 2013–2014 Hamburg demonstrations =

Series of protests in Germany

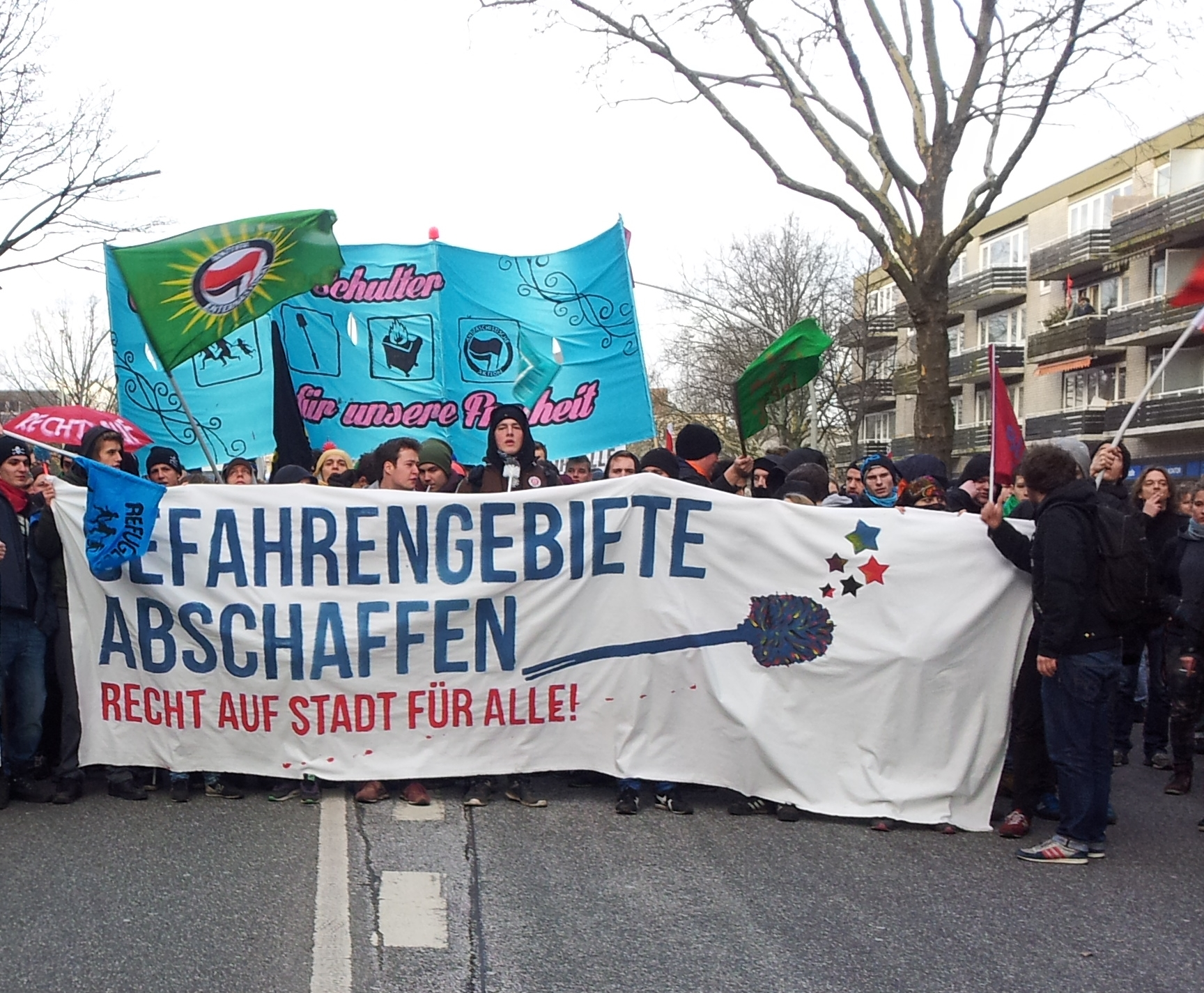
Demonstration against the 'danger zones' on 18 January 2014

The Hamburg protests were a large series of demonstrations in Hamburg, Germany, in December 2013 and January 2014.

== History ==
Toilet brush symbol adopted for the Hamburg protests

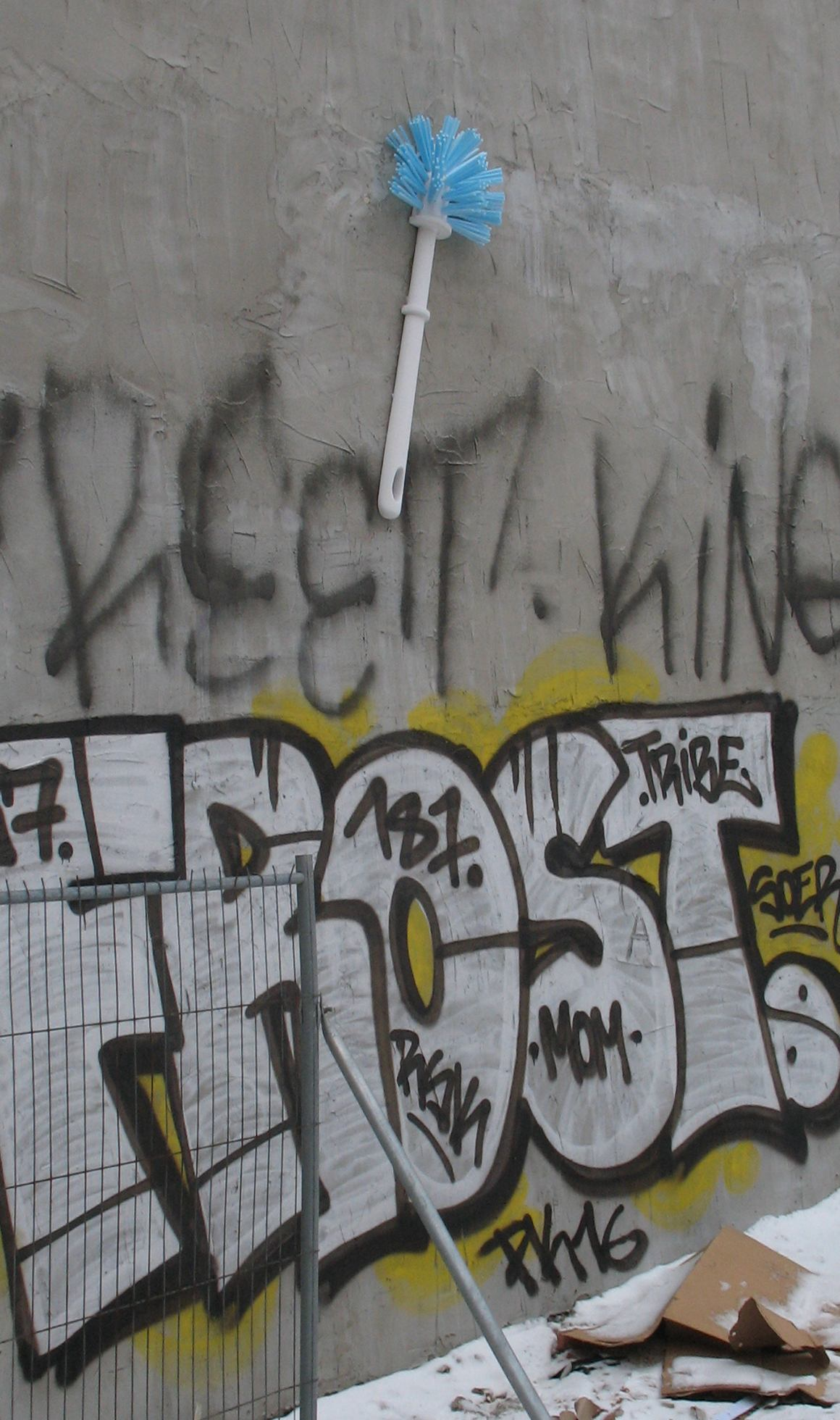
Toilet brush affixed to a wall, January 2014

In late December 2013, there were large demonstrations in Hamburg with a number of objectives: to advocate for refugees to be allowed to remain in the city; to protest against decisions to evict squatters from the Rote Flora building; and to protest the demolishing of a dilapidated block of flats colloquially known (due to the filling station out front) as the 'Esso houses'. Additional goals were to demand a reduction of consumerism and the provision of more public spaces. The primary focus of the unrest concerned the threatened eviction of the Rote Flora, a former theatre which was squatted in 1989 and became an anarchist self-managed social centre in 1989.

More than 7,000 demonstrators clashed violently with police on 21 December; scores of people were injured, including dozens of police (with estimates ranging up to 500 demonstrators and 120 police), and buildings including the Social Democratic Party's local offices were damaged. The following weekend, police at the Davidwache station on the Reeperbahn were attacked with stones and bottles and three were injured, one with a broken jaw. The rioting has been called the worst in Germany in many years, described in the Frankfurter Allgemeine Zeitung as "reminiscent of a civil war".

On 4 January 2014, Hamburg police established a 'danger zone' (German: Gefahrengebiet) encompassing the red-light districts of the city centre, in which a curfew was imposed and stop and frisk rules were put into effect, leading to further protests both in the city and online, where the Twitter hashtag #WirSindAlleHamburg (We are all Hamburg) trended widely. In response, the zone was reduced to three 'danger islands' and the curfew there limited to 6 pm to 6 am. The US Embassy in Berlin issued a travel advisory for the city. On January 13, police dissolved the danger zones, and a few days later, the borough of Altona announced a change in plans for the site that would ensure the Rote Flora would not be demolished and could remain a cultural centre.

Protesters adopted the toilet brush as a satirical symbol of defiance, after a video was circulated depicting a hooded man having a toilet brush confiscated by police, and also organised a pillow fight in St. Pauli. The list of items confiscated by police in the 'danger zones' was described in a news report as "rather lean and whimsical", including not only a truncheon, clubs, and a pocket knife but shawls and a plastic bucket. An unknown number of toilet brushes were noted but not taken from their owners.

Gentrification of central Hamburg was a major concern in the December protests, with activists accusing the city of permitting the landlord of the 'Esso buildings' to let them decay so that they would have to be demolished. The anti-gentrification group Recht auf Stadt was prominent in the initial demonstrations. Some activists have said the later protests included more "drunken football hooligans" and other destructive participants "without a political motive", and eyewitness accounts have cast doubt on the police account of the Davidwache incident as pre-planned and politically motivated.

== Maps ==
Maps of the 'danger zone'

Original 'danger zone'

'Danger islands' as enforced 9–13 January 2014
