= Sternschanze =

- Quarter of Hamburg
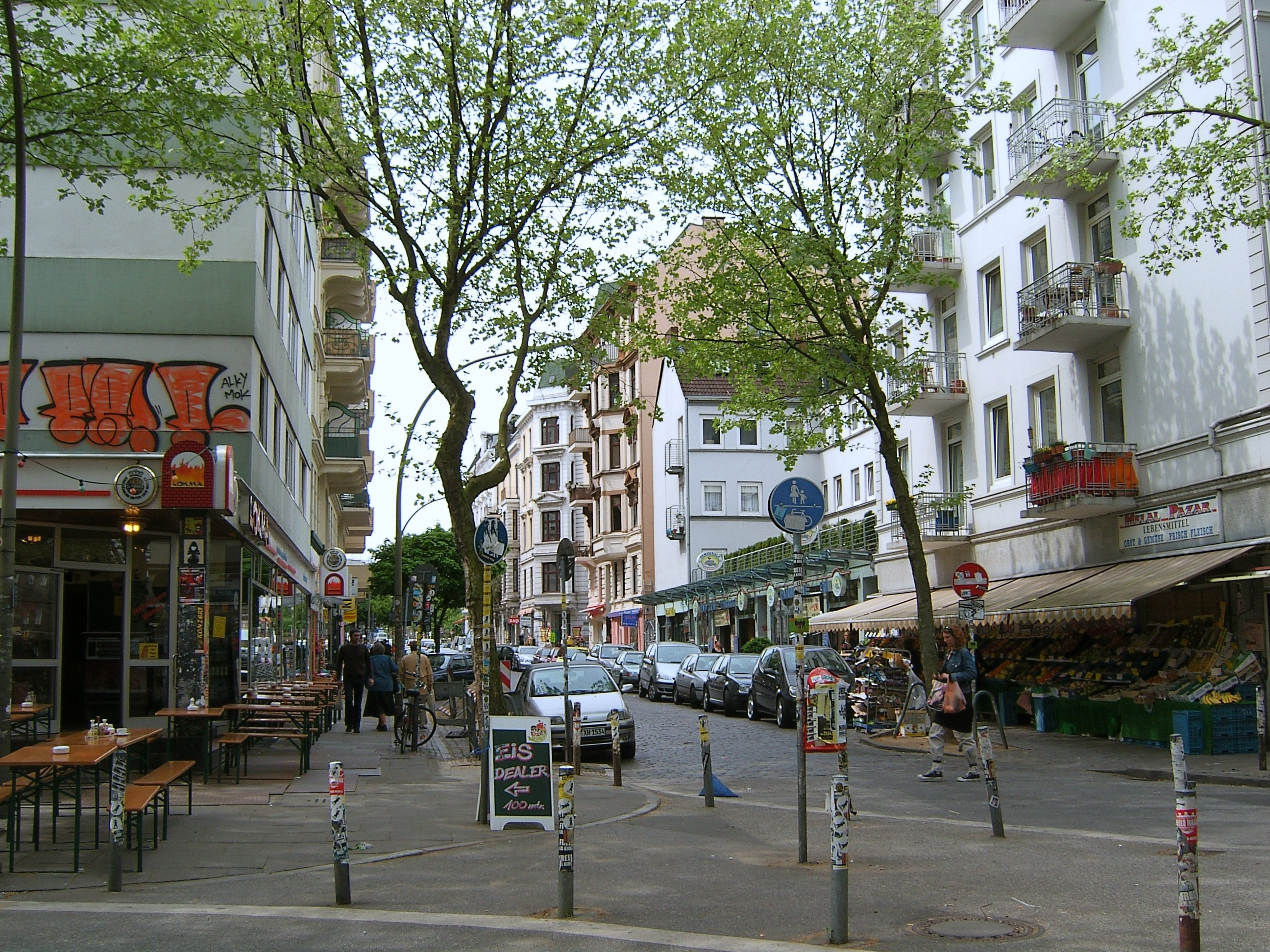
- Susannenstraße, a typical street "in der Schanze"
- Interactive map of Sternschanze
- Location within Germany Location within Hamburg
- Coordinates: 53°33′42″N 9°57′44″E
- Country: Germany
- State: Hamburg
- City: Hamburg
- Borough: Altona, Hamburg

Area
  - Total: 0.6 km^{2} (0.23 sq mi)

Population (2024-12-31)
  - Total: 7,669
  - Density: 13,000/km^{2} (33,000/sq mi)
- Time zone: UTC+01:00 (CET)
  - Summer (DST): UTC+02:00 (CEST)
- Dialling codes: 040
- Vehicle registration: HH

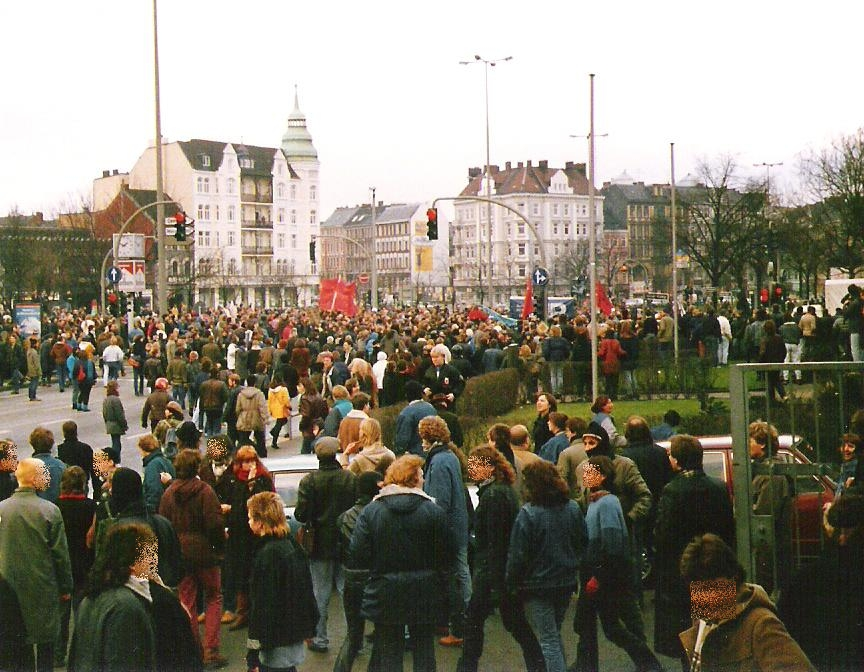
Demonstration by leftist groups, amongst others for the squatted Hafenstraße houses in neighbouring St. Pauli on 20 December 1986

Sternschanze (German pronunciation: [ˈʃtɛʁnˌʃantsə], lit. 'Star Sconce') is a quarter in the centre of Hamburg (Germany) within the Altona borough. In 2014, the population was 7,776 on an area of 0.6 km^{2} with a density of 14,113 inhabitants per km^{2}. After Reeperbahn, it is Hamburg's best known entertainment and nightlife district. It is also known as Schanzenviertel ([ˈʃantsn̩ˌfɪʁtl̩]) and nicknamed Schanze ([ˈʃantsə]).

== History ==
The name of the quarter originates from a sconce (German: Schanze) shaped like a star that was built in 1682 in front of the Hamburg Wallring. From the 1930s to the 1970s the quarter was home to a large number of working-class people. In the 1970s, families and students started moving into the area. It nearly, but not fully, maps onto the entertainment district area of Schanzenviertel with its many bars and clubs, which is known as “die Schanze" by its inhabitants. In the local slang, residents here live "in the sconce" ("in der Schanze").

The former concert house/theatre building Rote Flora (built in 1888 as Flora concert hall) is also located here, at the street known as Schulterblatt. It was squatted by leftist groups in 1989, after plans in 1987/88 emerged to rebuild it as a new musical theatre. These plans were later realized near Holstenstraße station as Neue Flora. Since the beginning of the occupation, Rote Flora was used for cultural events by the squatting groups. In 2000, the building was acquired by real-estate agent Klausmartin Kretschmer, under a contract where the city of Hamburg prohibited him to make any alterations. Because he planned to make alterations anyway, conflicts arose with residents. In 2014, Hamburg city re-bought the building to avoid further conflicts; the building was renovated in 2015 by volunteers.

Since the beginning of the new millennium, Sternschanze has become en vogue and subject to gentrification. Nevertheless, political demonstrations, mostly by leftist groups, take place here and sometimes lead to clashes with the police, frequently on 1 May (German Labour Day). Graffiti paintings can be found on many walls throughout the quarter. In 2008, the area of Schanzenviertel, which formerly was cut into three parts by the boundaries of Hamburg-Mitte, Eimsbüttel, and Altona, was merged into the new quarter of Sternschanze, which since then has belonged only to the Altona borough.

== Politics ==
These are the results of Sternschanze in the Hamburg state election:

State Election	Greens	Left	SPD	CDU	FDP	AfD	Others
2025	31,4 %	33,2 %	18,2 %	5,2 %	1,7 %	2,0 %	8,3 %
2020	40,8 %	26,9 %	16,5 %	2,7 %	2,3 %	1,2 %	9,6 %
2015	27,0 %	29,1 %	26,6 %	2,9 %	3,6 %	1,3 %	9,5 %
2011	24,9 %	19,8 %	37,9 %	4,1 %	2,8 %	–	10,5 %
2008	24,9 %	16,2 %	40,7 %	13,3 %	1,9 %	–	3,1 %

== Geography ==
Sternschanze is located between the quarters of St. Pauli, Altona-Altstadt, Eimsbüttel, and Rotherbaum.

== Transportation ==
Sternschanze station is serviced by Hamburg S-Bahn (lines S2, S5, S7) and U-Bahn trains (U3 line), Feldstraße - which is officially located in neighbouring St. Pauli quarter - by the underground line U3 only. Schlump station is located on the north eastern boundaries of the Sternschanze quarter and served by underground lines U2 and U3.
