= Rote Flora =

Autonomous cultural centre in Hamburg, Germany

Coordinates: 53.56199°N 9.96150°E

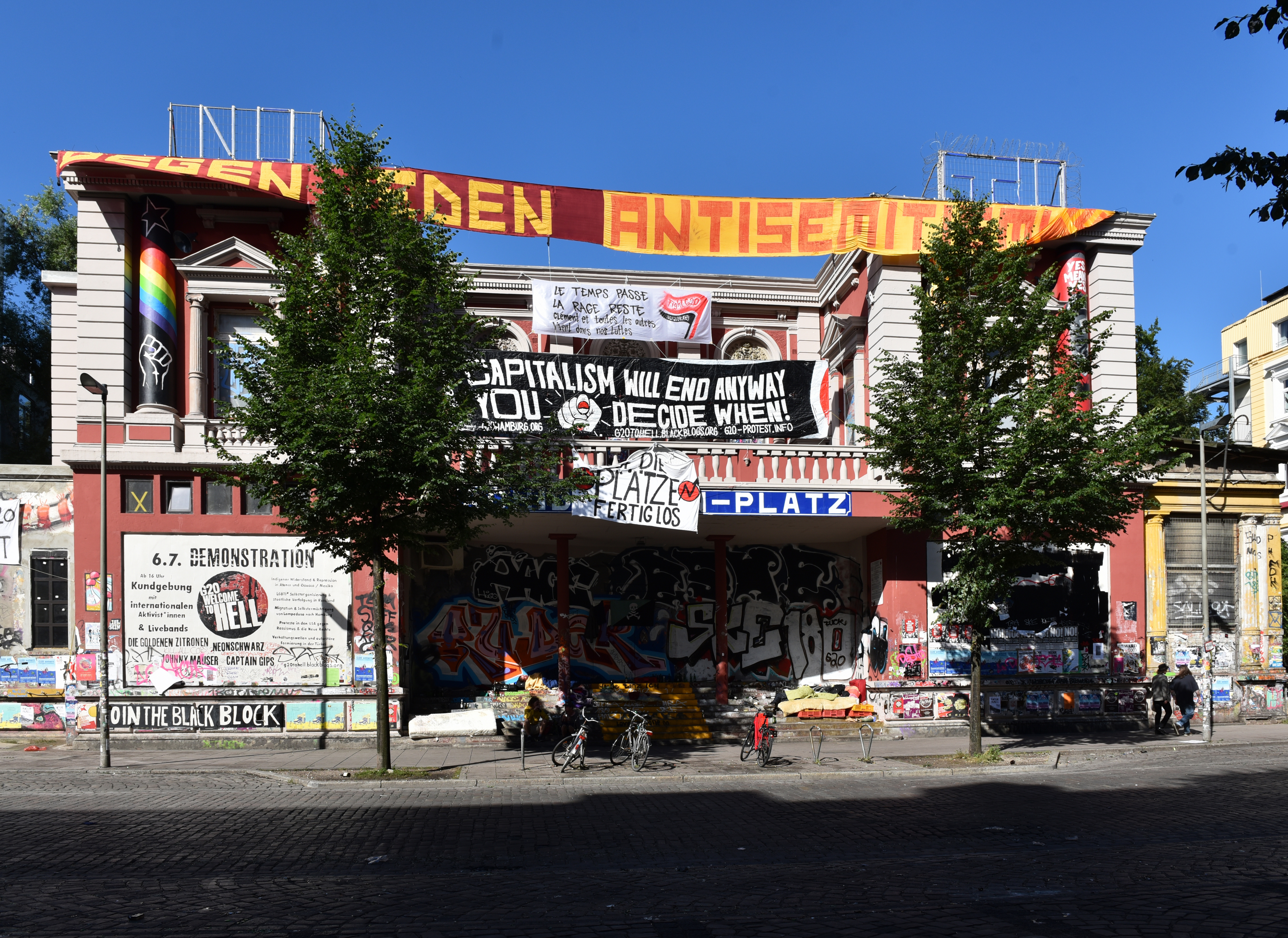
- Rote Flora in 2017
- Former names: Tivoli Theatre

General information
- Status: Squatted
- Type: Theatre
- Location: Hamburg
- Estimated completion: 1835
- Opened: 1989 (squatted)

Design and construction
- Known for: self-managed social centre

Website
- rote-flora.de

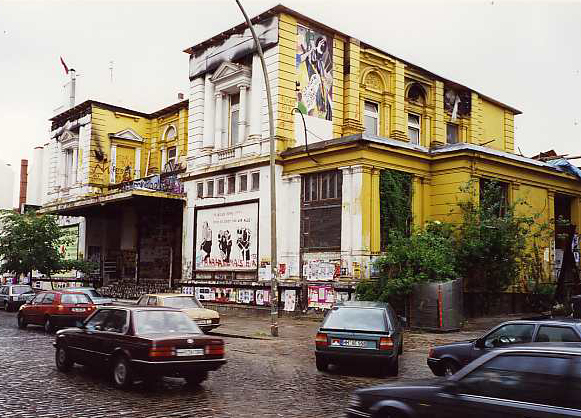
Rote Flora in 1996

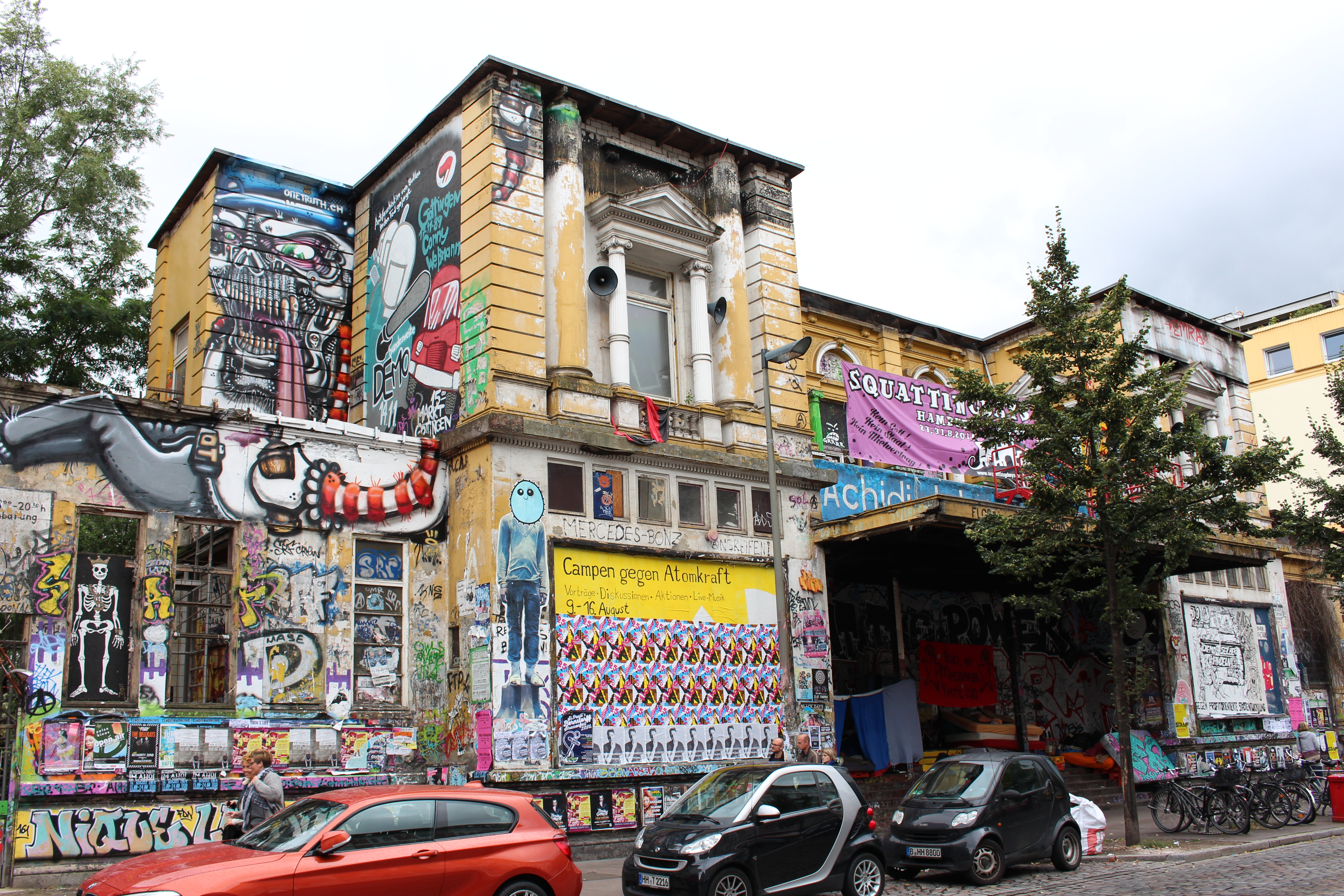

The Rote Flora is a former theatre in the Sternschanze district of Hamburg, Germany. It has been squatted since November 1989 as a self-managed social centre.

== History of the building ==
The Flora theatre was constructed on Schulterblatt in 1835. It was used for concerts, operettas, revues, and boxing matches. It became a variety theatre until it shut down after World War II. It was used as a cinema and then became a bargain store called 1000 Töpfe.

In the late 1980s, local people were alarmed by the plans of Friedrich Kurz to gentrify the theatre by making it a venue for performances of The Phantom of the Opera, fearing it would attract tourists and change the area; they proposed to turn it into a community centre instead. The alternative plans were ignored by the city and the rear of the building was demolished in April 1988. Sabotage attacks began on the construction site and bowing to the local pressure, the community was given a temporary lease to use the building. When the lease expired on 1 November 1989, the occupiers stayed and the building was squatted. It was a week before the fall of the Berlin Wall and the new inhabitants said it was a "free space for realizing an autonomous life." It has remained squatted ever since.

== Social centre ==
At the beginning the occupiers were very much focused on local struggles and as time went by, the Rote Flora has developed into a self-managed social centre connected to left-wing, anarchist activism, with links to similar projects in Amsterdam, Berlin and Copenhagen. Its structures of internal organisation and self-governance can be compared to a form of radical sovereign self-rule. The building provides a music venue, an infoshop, a social movement archive, a bar, a cafe, rehearsal rooms and a bicycle repair workshop. The Government of Hamburg offered to give the project a contract in the early 1990s but the offer was refused. Later, it decided to sell the building to a developer called Klausmartin Kretschmer for 370,000 DM, with the proviso that it would remain a social centre. When a well-known neo-Nazi was given a social housing apartment in a block behind the project in the 1990s, Rote Flora organised demonstrations against his tenancy.

The collective said in 2001 "We are the 'UFO in the neighbourhood.' The black hole in public space. The City won't get rid of us because we are a part of what life is." Regarding the new owner, it said "We neither asked Kretschmer to buy the Flora almost nine years ago, nor are we in the slightest interested in his opinions about the political ideologies and the work of the Rote Flora". The contract Kretschmer had signed with the city expired in 2011, the Rote Flora started a campaign of resistance called "Flora remains incompatible" (German: 'Flora bleibt unverträglich') to campaign against possible eviction. The city offered him 1.1 million euros to buy back the building, but he requested 5 million euros. In December 2013, the city's decision to redevelop the Rote Flora site became the focus of large and sometimes violent demonstrations. Ultimately, in mid-January 2014, the borough of Altona announced a change in plans for the site that would ensure the building would not be demolished and could remain a cultural centre. Mayor Olaf Scholz agreed to pay Kretschmer 820,000 euros, whilst two security guards swore under oath that Kretschmer had wanted to pay them to burn the building down to get rid of it. Later in 2014, the Rota Flora celebrated 25 years of existence.

During the 2017 G20 Hamburg summit, the Rote Flora was a major hotspot and following riots in the Schanzenviertel rightwing commentators demanded that the Rote Flora be closed down. The Rote Flora distanced itself from the rioters, with a spokesperson saying that "that a form of militancy was brought onto the streets which was intoxicated with itself, and we find that both politically and in terms of content wrong" ("dass hier eine Form von Militanz auf die Straße getragen wurde, die sich selbst berauscht hat und das finden wir politisch und inhaltlich falsch"). A former police officer who studies left-wing politics wrote that activists spend a lot of time maintaining and organising the Rote Flora, time which then takes them away from other political projects.

As well as being a centre of left-wing activism, the Rote Flora has become a destination for alternative tourism, since the Schanzenviertel is gentrifying. Rules posted at the door of the centre in 2018 state: "We will not tolerate any kind of sexism, racism, anti-Semitism, ableism, homophobia, transphobia, lookism or any kind of boundary-crossing behaviour here." The Rote Flora collective gave the building the address of Achidi-John Platz 1 to commemorate a man, Achidi John, who died in 2001 after being forced by police officers to swallow an emetic.

Rote Flora condemned the October 7 attacks and "the suffering that war has brought upon the civilian population on all sides" of the ensuing war. Rote Flora's stance resulted in conflict with local anti-Zionist activists, who occupied the building for a few hours in May 2024 and accused it of being a "Zionist hub".

== See also ==
- Hafenstraße
- Squatting in Hamburg
