= List of killings by law enforcement officers in post-reunification Germany =

Listed below are people killed by non-military law enforcement officers in Germany after reunification on 3 October 1990, whether or not in the line of duty, irrespective of reason or method. Included, too, are cases where individuals died in police custody due to applied techniques. Inclusion in the list implies neither wrongdoing nor justification on the part of the person killed or the officer involved. The listing simply documents occurrences of deaths and is not complete.

== Statistics ==
Year	Number killed by use of firearms (official statistics)	Number killed by any means (counted)	Number of shots fired on persons
1990	7 (post-reunification)		76 (57 in old states, 19 in Mecklenburg-Vorpommern, Sachsen and Thüringen only; full year)
1991	9		136
1992	12		150
1993	16		123
1994	11 (including Halim Dener)		118
1995	21		137
1996	11		95
1997	13		68
1998	8		70
1999	19		61
2000	6		52
2001	8		68
2002	7		42
2003	3		44
2004	9		63
2005	5		37
2006	6		At least 27
2007	12		46
2008	10		37
2009	6		57
2010	8		40
2011	6		36 (+109)
2012	8		38
2013	8		42
2014	7		51
2015	11	13	41
2016	13		52
2017	16		76
2018	11		58
2019	15	19	62
2020	15	20	75
2021	8	15	51
2022	11 (e.g. Mouhamed Dramé)	18	60
2023	10	14	66
2024	22		75
2025	17 (e.g. Lorenz A.)		115
2026	9		
Sum	394 minimum		2453 minimum

Figures before 1978 can not be compared directly to later numbers. A list of police killings was first compiled 1997; owing to a legal 20-year document retention limit, some files may have been destroyed. Additionally, the numbers here do not include suicides.

== See also ==
- Lists of killings by law enforcement officers
- Use of firearms by police in Germany
