= Death of Laye-Alama Condé =

2005 death in German police custody

Laye-Alama Condé (also known as Laye-Alma Condé) was an asylum seeker from Sierra Leone living in Bremen, Germany. On 27 December 2004, he was arrested by the police on suspicion of being a drug dealer. At the station, a doctor forcibly inserted a tube through Condé's nose and fed him syrup of ipecac (an emetic). This occurred several times until Condé collapsed and was taken to hospital. He died on 7 January 2005. The case immediately caused controversy in Germany and the doctor was taken to court three times, resulting in a punishment of a fine of 20,000 euros paid to Condé's family. Meanwhile, the practice of induced vomiting was deemed torture by the European Court of Human Rights in 2006 and the practice was discontinued in Bremen shortly afterwards. The Initiative in Memory of Laya Alama Condé (German: Initiative in Gedenken an Laya Alama Condé) has pressed for a permanent monument to people who died in police custody to be erected in Bremen.

== Incident ==
Laye-Alama Condé was an asylum seeker from Sierra Leone living in Bremen, Germany. On 27 December 2004, the police arrested Condé on suspicion of dealing drugs. He allegedly had hazelnut-sized pellets of cocaine in his mouth, which he swallowed. Condé was in police custody when a doctor forced syrup of ipecac (an emetic) into his stomach through his nose with a 70 cm long tube, aiming to make him vomit and therefore produce the drugs as evidence of crime. Condé swallowed back the vomit that had been induced, washing liquid into his lungs. The process was forcefully repeated several times until Condé had foam coming out of his mouth and nose. He then collapsed and was resuscitated by paramedics before being taken to the hospital. Condé fell into a coma and died over a week later, on 7 January 2005. The Federal Court of Justice declared in 2010 that he had died from "cerebral hypoxia as a result of drowning after aspiration during forced vomiting".

== Later events ==
The death immediately caused controversy since it was caused by the practice of forcefully administering emetics. In Bremen there were over 1,000 such incidents between 1991 and 2004, and it was supported by the ruling coalition. Achidi John had died in Hamburg in 2001 under similar circumstances to Condé. There, Olaf Scholz had said the practice was "without an alternative". In 2006, the European Court of Human Rights ruled that the practice constituted torture, and it was discontinued in Bremen soon afterwards.

The doctor who had administered the emetic was placed under investigation. He was a foreigner national, working for a private institution contracted by the Senate of Bremen. His qualifications were called into question, but charges against him were dropped. On appeal, the Federal Court overturned the decision on legal grounds in 2010. Another investigation cleared the doctor and this verdict was also overturned by the higher court. In 2013, a third investigation ended by telling the doctor to pay a fine of 20,000 euros to the family of Condé. The doctor had fallen seriously ill by this point and the family said they were less concerned with punishing him and more concerned with having a ruling on the legality of induced vomiting.

The Initiative in Memory of Laya Alama Condé (German: Initiative in Gedenken an Laya Alama Condé) was set up to remember his death, holding a memorial every 7 January. It also pressured the city to make a permanent memorial to Condé, which generated more controversy. In 2019, it created a mobile artwork which stood outside different places in central Bremen and was dedicated to all people who died in police custody. A representative termed Condé's demise as "death by drowning".
