= Death of Oury Jalloh =

Death of an asylum seeker in German police custody

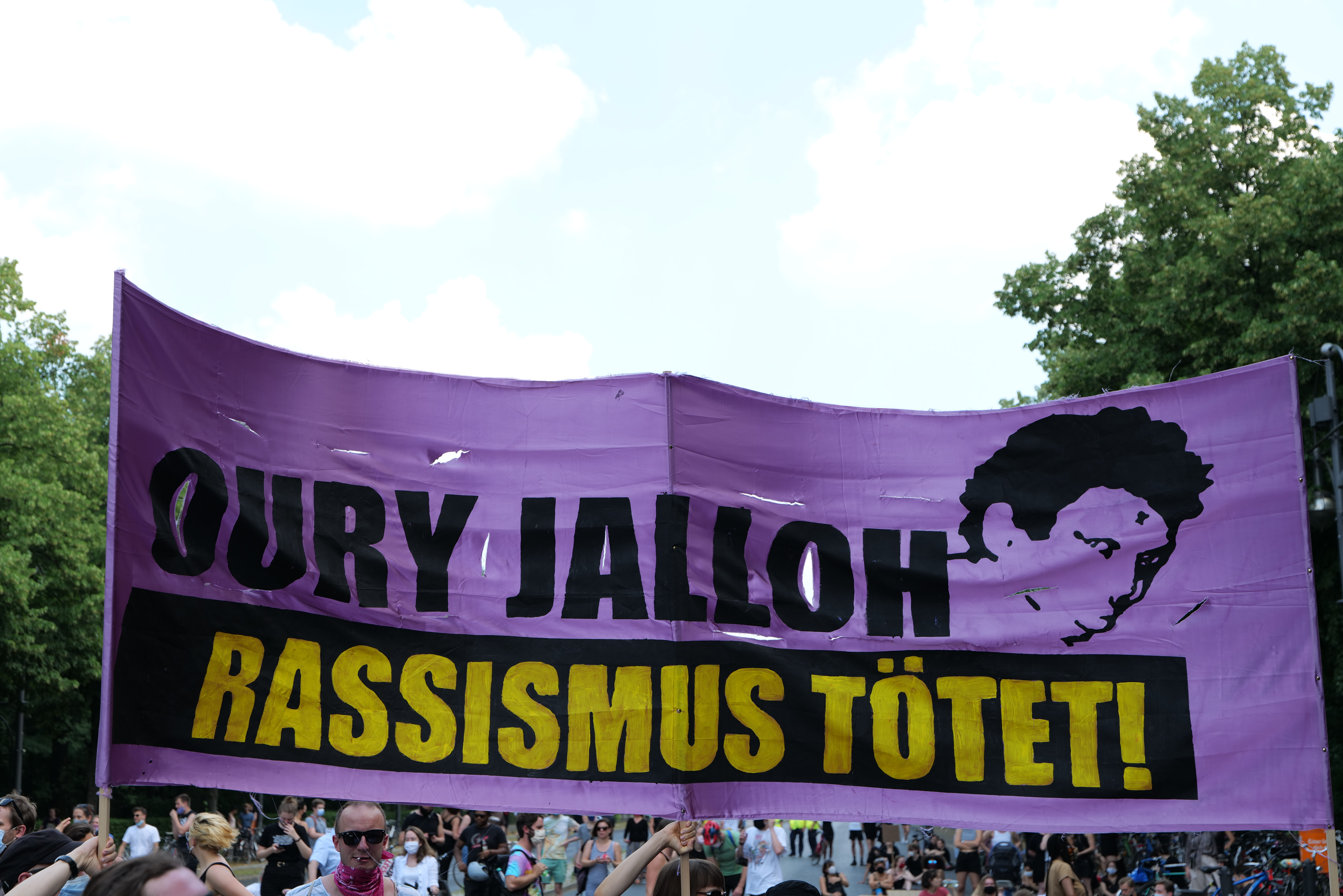
Oury Jalloh's face on a banner at a Black Lives Matter demonstration in Berlin, 2020

Oury Jalloh (1969 – 7 January 2005) was an asylum seeker who was found dead, bound and badly burned after a fire in the police cell where he was being held in Dessau, Germany. The hands and feet of Jalloh, who was alone in the cell, were tied to a mattress. A fire alarm went off, but was initially turned off without further action by an officer. The case caused national and international outrage at the official narrative of suicide.

== Life ==
According to documents that his parents later filed in court, Oury Jalloh was born in 1969 in Conakry, Guinea. Reportedly he fled from the Sierra Leone Civil War to Guinea, where his parents were already living, and came to Germany in 1999, where he applied for political asylum. His application was declined, but he received an exceptional leave to remain in the country. His child with a German citizen was put up for adoption by the mother shortly after birth.

== Death ==
The official narrative, as presented by police officers in their subsequent trial, was reported by newspapers such as Der Tagesspiegel. In the morning of 7 January 2005, at about 8 am, some street cleaners called the police and reported that a female colleague felt threatened by a drunk man (who was Oury Jalloh). When two policemen (Hans-Ulrich M. and Udo S.) arrived, Jalloh declined to show his identification and then resisted arrest. The officers put him in a headlock and took him into custody, intending to book him for harassment although charges were never made. At the police station, the two policemen took Jalloh to the basement and held him whilst a doctor took his blood to test for alcohol and drugs. The test showed a BAC of about 3‰ and indicated usage of cocaine. The doctor assessed Jalloh as safe to be locked up. Jalloh was taken to a cell and held until he could be seen by a judge. Two officers dragged him to a cell and handcuffed him to a bed by his hands and feet.

Policewoman Beate H. was working in the second floor control room, together with Andreas S., her superior. On the intercom she heard Jalloh rattling his chains and swearing, so she attempted to calm him and she reports later she heard other officers in the cell. She went to check on him herself at about 11:30 am, without noting anything unusual. She returned to the control room, where Andreas S. turned down the intercom volume and she told him to turn it back up. At around noon she claimed she heard splashing sounds and told Andreas S. it was his turn to check. She originally said that after the fire alarm went off, Andreas S. turned it off twice. When another different alarm went off, he went to check what was going on. Gerhard M. followed Andreas S. downstairs to the cells, where they found Jalloh alive but burning to death. His final word was "Fire".

The police suggested that Jalloh had burnt himself to death, using a lighter to ignite the foam mattress he was lying on in the cell. One appeared in an evidence bag several days after Jalloh's death.

== Federal investigations ==
The official autopsy concluded that the immediate cause of death was likely heat shock to Jalloh's lungs by smoke inhalation. A later 2019 autopsy conducted by experts from Goethe University after being commissioned by Jalloh's family, found that he had a broken rib, a broken nose and a fracture at the base of his skull, indicating that Oury Jalloh may have been tortured before his death. The original autopsy had listed only a recent nose fracture. The doctors were convinced that the injuries had occurred before death.

In March 2007, a trial was opened at the state court of Dessau against police officers Hans-Ulrich M. and his superior, Andreas S. The two officers were charged for causing bodily harm with fatal consequences, and for involuntary manslaughter, respectively. On 8 December 2008 the court acquitted both defendants of all charges. According to Manfred Steinhoff, the presiding judge, contradictory testimony had prevented clarification of the circumstances and had obstructed due process. In his closing speech Steinhoff accused the police officers of lying in court and thus damaging the reputation of the state of Saxony-Anhalt. The trial had thrown up inconsistencies and gaps in the narrative of the police officers and had lasted 60 days instead of the scheduled four. Fire experts had been unable to recreate the means of death. The issue of how the lighter that had allegedly been used to start the fire got into the cell was unexplained. Beate H. changed her initial report to say that Andreas S. had not turned down the fire alarm twice but rather got up and went downstairs, but she was unable to say exactly when because she worked with her back facing the door. The family and supporters of Jalloh were outraged by the verdict. The family had been offered €5,000 by the court since it could not establish the guilt of the officers, but Jalloh's father said he did not want the money.

On 7 January 2010, exactly five years after Jalloh died in his cell, the Bundesgerichtshof federal court in Karlsruhe overturned the earlier verdict. The case was relegated to the state court of Saxony-Anhalt at Magdeburg for retrial. During the investigations the deaths of Hans-Jürgen Rose (died from internal injuries hours after being released from the same police building in 1997) and Mario Bichtemann (died from an unsupervised skull fracture in the same cell in 2002) were re-examined. In 2012, Andreas S. was found guilty of involuntary manslaughter and fined €10,800. A new trial then began in 2014 and ended without any convictions in 2017.

In August 2020 the Landtag of Saxony-Anhalt published a report by special investigators Jerzy Montag and Manfred Nötzel on the Jalloh case, calling the policemen's actions "flawed" and "contrary to the law" (German: "fehlerhaft" und "rechtswidrig"). However, they concluded that the district attorney's final dismissal of the case in 2017 was "factually and legally correct in view of available evidence".

== Initiative in Memory of Oury Jalloh ==
The Initiative in Memory of Oury Jalloh (Initiative in Gedenken an Oury Jalloh) was set up to pursue justice for Oury Jalloh and to campaign against police violence. In 2021, the initiative commissioned a report from a fire forensics expert to assess how Jalloh died. The expert found it unlikely that someone tied to a bed could have set themselves on fire. A dummy body made from a dead pig was then attached to the mattress and set on fire. It was only when using petrol that the dummy body burnt in a way commensurate to the way the body of Jalloh was burned. The expert concluded that it was most likely petrol had been used.

Based on this opinion, the initiative and the family of Jalloh called for the murder investigation to be reopened by the Federal Prosecutor. They also announced plans to sue the Attorney General's Office of Saxony-Anhalt for obstruction of justice, because it had ceased its investigation in 2018.

== In popular culture ==
A television documentary entitled Tod in der Zelle – Warum starb Oury Jalloh? (transl. Death in a cell – Why did Oury Jalloh die?) was released in 2006. It went on to win the "Best Professional Production" award at the 2006 Nuremberg International Human Rights Film Festival.

The 2015 episode "Verbrannt" ("Burned") of the popular German crime series Tatort is based on a fictionalized retelling of the death of Oury Jalloh.

Jalloh is mentioned by name in the 2021 song "Das ist alles von der Kunstfreiheit gedeckt" by Danger Dan, which entered the German and Austrian charts for several weeks. The singer firmly states that the police tied Jalloh up and set him on fire.

== See also ==
- Death of Christy Schwundeck
- Killing of N'deye Mareame Sarr

== Sources ==
- von Bouillon, Constanze (30 July 2007). "Wie starb Oury Jalloh?" [How did Oury Jalloh die?]. tagesspiegel.de (in German). Tagesspiegel. Archived from the original on 20 October 2012.
- Douglas, Elliot (28 August 2020). "Death of asylum-seeker Oury Jalloh: German investigators slam police, courts and politicians". dw.com. Deutsche Welle. Archived from the original on 28 August 2020.
- Kreickenbaum, Martin (11 January 2012). "Police attack peaceful anti-racist protesters in Germany". World Socialist Web Site. ICFI. Archived from the original on 19 December 2012.
- Langer, Phil C. (2015). "Why do I do what I do – On interdependencies of biographical experiences and academic work in the third generation". In Misselwitz, Charlotte; Siebeck, Cornelia (eds.). Dissonant memories – Fragmented present. Kultur und soziale Praxis. Bielefeld: transcript Verlag. p. 33. doi:10.14361/9783839412732-002. ISBN 9783837612738. S2CID 148137222.
- Montag, Jerzy; Nötzel, Manfred (26 August 2020). "Bericht der vom Ausschuss für Recht, Verfassung und Gleichstellung des Landtags Sachsen-Anhalt beauftragten Berater" [Report of the advisors commissioned by the Landtag of Sachsen-Anhalt's Committee for Justice, Constitution and Equal Treatment] (in German). Landtag Sachsen-Anhalt. Archived from the original (PDF) on 26 June 2021.
- Overath, Margot (7 January 2011). "Tod eines Asylanten – Was geschah in Zelle Nr. 5?" [Death of an asylum seeker – What happened in cell no. 5?]. tagesspiegel.de (in German). Berlin: Tagesspiegel. Archived from the original on 20 October 2012.
- Oschlies, Renate (12 January 2011). "Verbrannter Asylbewerber Oury Jalloh – Was geschah in Gewahrsamszelle 5?" [Burned to death asylum seeker Oury Jalloh – What happened in holding cell 5?]. Frankfurter Rundschau (in German). Frankfurt am Main, Germany. Archived from the original on 15 January 2011.
- Peters, Freia (8 December 2008). "Verbrannter Asylbewerber – Wutausbruch nach Polizistenfreispruch in Dessau" [Burned asylum seeker – Outrage after police acquittal in Dessau]. welt.de (in German). Welt. Archived from the original on 9 December 2008.
- Westphal, Markus (17 December 2006). "Human Rights Prize Goes to Film About Refugee's Death". dw.com. Deutsche Welle. Archived from the original on 24 May 2021.
- Zell, Sonja; Meier, Thomas (December 2009). "Hintergrund 1: Der Fall Oury Jalloh" [Background 1: The Oury Jalloh case]. Flucht und Asyl – Arbeitshilfe zum Globalen Lernen ab Sekundarstufe I [Escape and asylum – Learning supplement for Global learning for secondary education level I and higher] (in German). Berlin: Entwicklungspolitisches Bildungs- und Informationszentrum (EPIZ e.V.). Archived from the original (PDF) on 15 August 2011.
- "Neues Gutachten nährt alte Zweifel" [New expert opinion feeds old doubts]". Tages Schau (in German). 3 November 2021.
- "German Police Officers Cleared of Prisoner's Death". dw.com. Deutsche Welle. 8 December 2008. Archived from the original on 24 May 2021.
- "Federal court orders new trial in burning death of asylum seeker". dw.com. Deutsche Welle. 8 January 2010. Archived from the original on 24 May 2021.
- "Germany: Asylum-seeker found dead in jail had 'bones fractured' before death". Deutsche Welle. 29 October 2019.
