= Hafenstraße =

Legalized squats in Hamburg, Germany

- St. Pauli-Hafenstraße
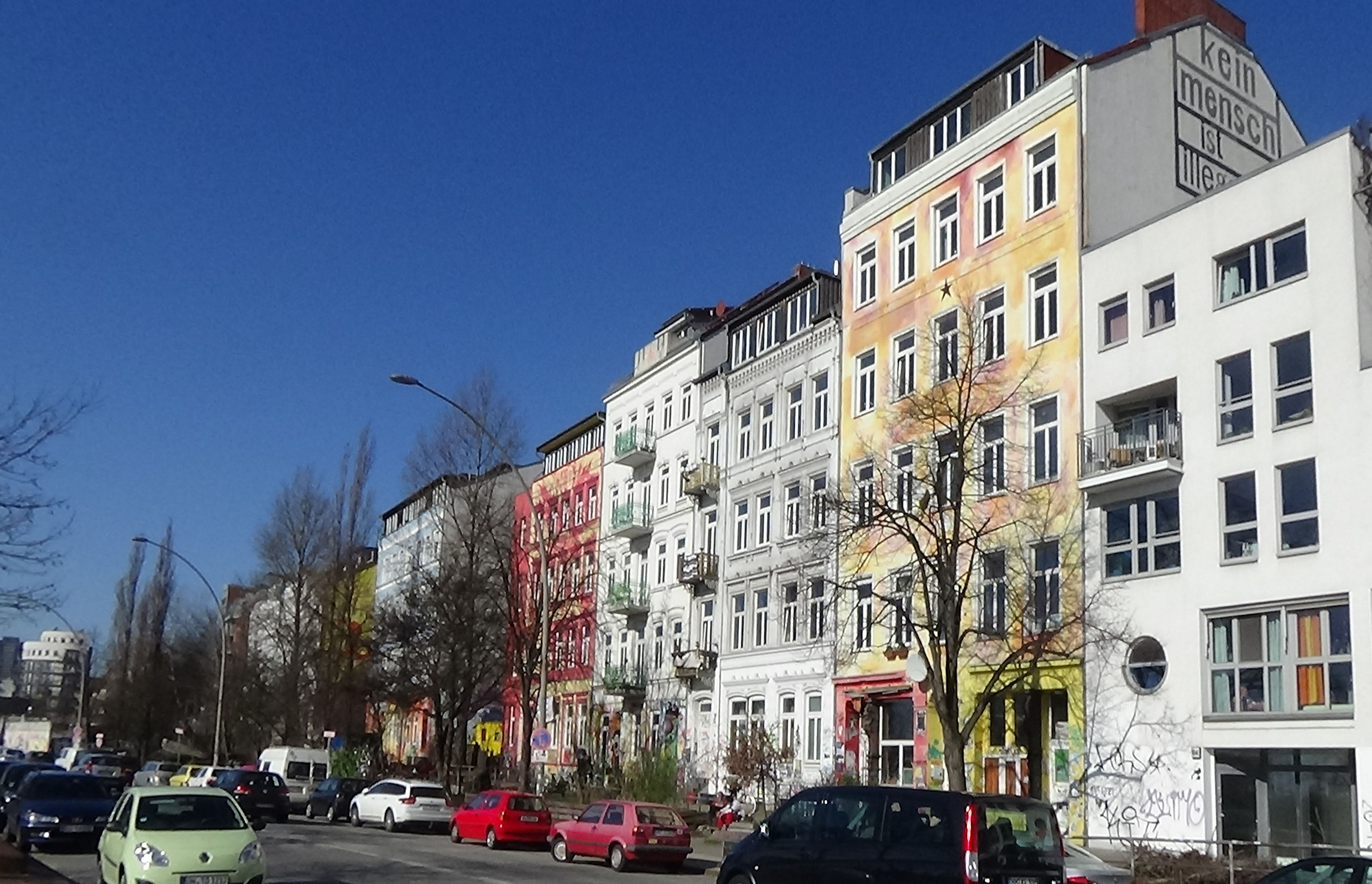

- Location within Hamburg Location within Germany
- Location: St. Pauli, Hamburg, Germany
- Coordinates: 53°32′47″N 9°57′34″E

Other
- Known for: Squatting
- Status: Occupied

Hafenstraße is a street in St. Pauli, a quarter of Hamburg, Germany, known for its legalized squats. The squats were occupied in 1981 and became a figurehead for autonomist and anti-imperialist politics. After a prolonged battle with the city council which involved demonstrations of over 10,000 people, the buildings were legalized in the 1990s. Today they are owned by a self-organised cooperative.

== Occupation ==
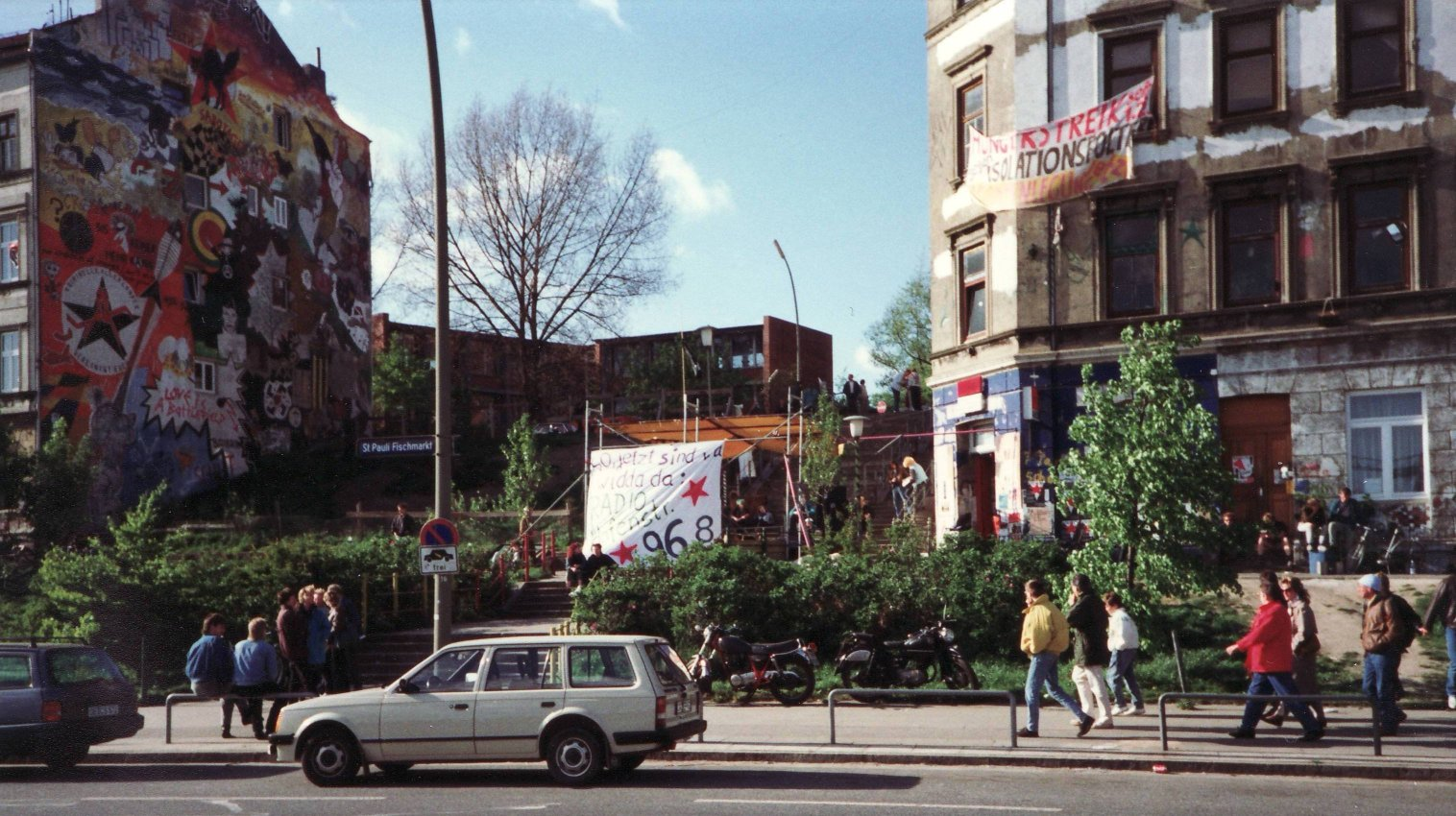
View of two squatted houses in the Hafenstraße in 1989.

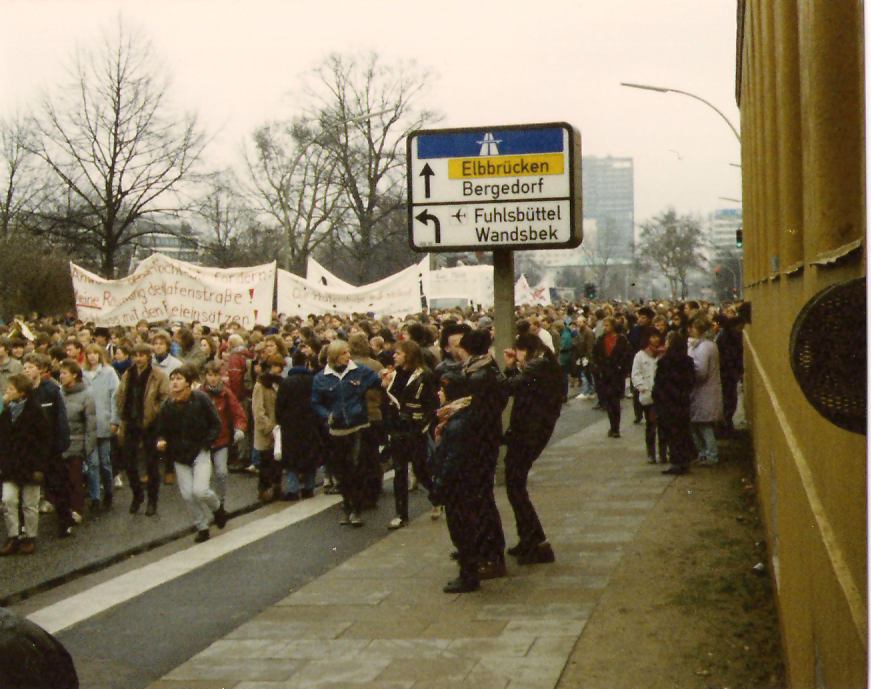
1986 demonstration in support of Hafenstraße

Hafenstraße (German Hafen – harbour; Straße – street) is a common German abbreviation of St. Pauli-Hafenstraße, a street in St. Pauli, a quarter of Hamburg, Germany.

The Hafenstraße occupation began in 1981, when twelve buildings were squatted. They were to become extremely important symbols for the German squatters movement and for urban activists more generally. Students who were already living there joined with autonomists to save the buildings on Hafenstraße and Bernhard-Nocht-Straße from being demolished. The apartment blocks had been constructed in 1900 and were in serious need of renovation. It was not noticed that the buildings had been squatted until 1982, when the owner SAGA immediately reported the trespass and the police evicted the squatters. The buildings were quickly reoccupied. The squatters then signed a three-year temporary use contract and argued they should be permitted to restore the buildings themselves. This led to conflict with the city council, which repeatedly attempted to evict them.

== History ==
As well as building a permanent fortress to resist evictions, the squatters organized a pirate radio station and a Volxküche (cafe) which was founded in 1982 and still exists. Christian Lochte, head of the Department for Protection of the Constitution of Hamburg, claimed that women from the Red Army Faction were living at Hafenstraße and the Hamburgische Electricitäts-Werke (HEW -Hamburg Energy Company) frequently raided the buildings. In June 1984, Hafenstraße was widely condemned after a woman was raped and tortured by three squatters; the three perpetrators were beaten up, had their heads shaved and were ejected from the houses. The controversy generated debate about sexism and violence in the autonomist movement. One apartment in the buildings became a women-only space.

In the 1980s, Hafenstraße became a centre for autonomist and anti-imperialist politics. If the factions disagreed on an issue, they were united in the defence of the houses. Other struggles included publicising the hunger strike of imprisoned RAF members in 1984 and protesting the death of antifascist Günter Sare in 1985. At New Year in 1986, the Hafentage (Harbour Days) were organised by the Autonomen and Danish squatters from the BZ-movement attended. When several apartments were evicted, the squatters fought back by setting fires in 13 department stores. As well as housing activists, the building housed homeless people, youths, and refugees.

Hafenstraße became known nationally and even internationally. As well as being a local symbol against gentrification and for the right to the city, the project became a centre for left-wing social movements such as anti-nuclear and anti-imperialist protests. Resistance to eviction culminated in street battles before the end of the contract in 1986, when 12,000 people marched to defend the squats. Black bloc tactics developed in Germany around this time. A pirate radio station, Radio Hafenstraße, was set up and autonomen launched a coordinated arson attack on 13 department stores throughout the city, causing over $10,000,000 in damages. Hamburg intellectual Jan Philipp Reemtsma offered to buy the houses for the symbolic price of 1 DM from the Senate, but the offer was rejected. When negotiations failed in 1987, the squatters readied themselves for more fighting and the mayor, Klaus von Dohnanyi went against the feeling of his party (SPD) and offered to resolve the situation peacefully. In response, senator Alfons Pawelczyk mobilised thousands of police officers and the squatters built barricades. In November 1987, a contract was signed at the last minute and the barricades were dismantled again. Dohnanyi later received the Theodor Heuss medal for managing the conflict; he had previously described Hafenstraße as a "wound in the city" ("eine Wunde in der Stadt"). Indicating the international attention paid to the events in Hamburg, a New York Times article was written about Hafenstraße and entitled "Squatters Win! (A Check book Did It)".

The Hamburg Higher Regional Court announced the contract was void in 1993, leading to more discussions. New mayor Henning Voscherau offered to fix the contract dispute if Hafenstrasse inhabitants agreed with nearby developments and social housing was built. In February 1995, the Hamburg Senate finally decided to sell the remaining houses to the inhabitants for around 2 million Deutsche Marks. The co-operative Alternativen am Elbufer (Alternatives beside the Elbe) then took on the ownership. In October 2007, a new house was built for 40 people at Bernhard-Nocht-Straße 26. In March 2019, a drugs raid resulted in 19 arrests.

== Murals ==
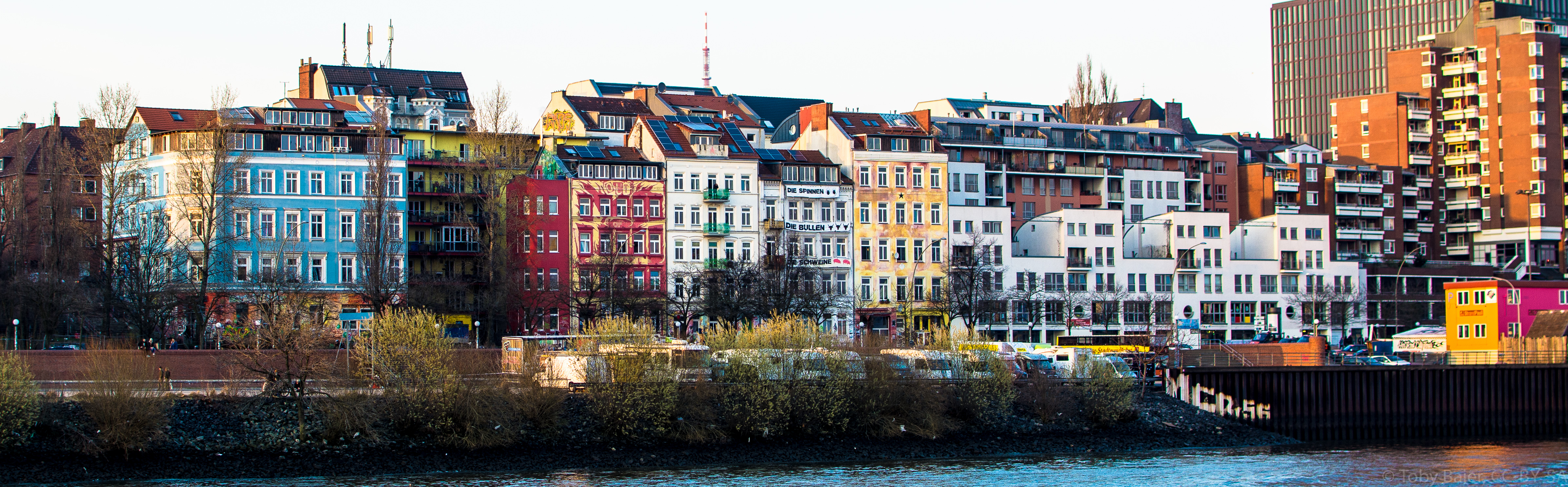
Wide shot of Hafenstraße street taken in 2015

Hafenstraße has long been known for its murals, which are painted on the fronts or on the side of buildings next to empty lots. In 1987, the squatters painted the slogan "Boycott 'Israel'! Goods, kibbutzim, and beaches". Israel was written in apostrophes to emphasise its illegitimacy. The mural formed part of a broader campaign against the sale of Israeli goods in Hamburg which was endorsed by civil rights activists such as Uri Davis who saw Israel's treatment of Palestinians in the same light as how South Africa treated its black population under apartheid. In 2018, a new mural in support of the Kurdish Women's Protection Units (YPJ) was unveiled on one building.

== Legacy ==
In 1998, The Independent newspaper referred to Hafenstraße as "the most famous squat in the world". Bands such as Die Goldenen Zitronen emerged from the scene around the Hafenstraße. Rasmus Gerlach made two documentary films about the Hafenstraße: Die Hafentreppe (1991) and Hafenstraße im Fluss (2010). In 2010, he commented that "it is the only attempt at utopia by the German left that has survived to this day" ("sie ist der einzige Utopie-Versuch der Bundesrepublikanischen Linken, der bis heute überlebt hat").

== Film ==
- Terrible Houses in Danger, Winter 1984–85, 45 mins
- Zwischen Dachziegel und Pflasterstein, 1985, 45 mins, Film about house occupations on Hafenstraße, Chemnitzstraße, Jägerpassage and Pinnasberg
- Die Augen schließen um besser zu sehen, 1986, 20 mins
- Irgendwie, irgendwo, irgendwann, 1987–88, 100 mins Reoccupation and barricade days
- Polizeiüberfall auf die Hafenstraße, 1989, 20 mins Eviction of wagenplatz
- Selbst das kleinste Licht durchbricht die Dunkelheit, 1990, 60 mins, Film about house raids
- Die Hafentreppe, Directors: Thomas Tode & Rasmus Gerlach. D 1991, 75 mins
- Empire St. Pauli – von Perlenketten und Platzverweisen. Documentary 2009, 85 mins
- "Hamburg damals: Die Hafenstraße [Hamburg back then: Hafenstraße]". NDR (in German). 5 May 2012.

== See also ==
- Rote Flora
- Squatting in Hamburg
