= Death of Achidi John =

2001 death of man in police custody in Hamburg, Germany

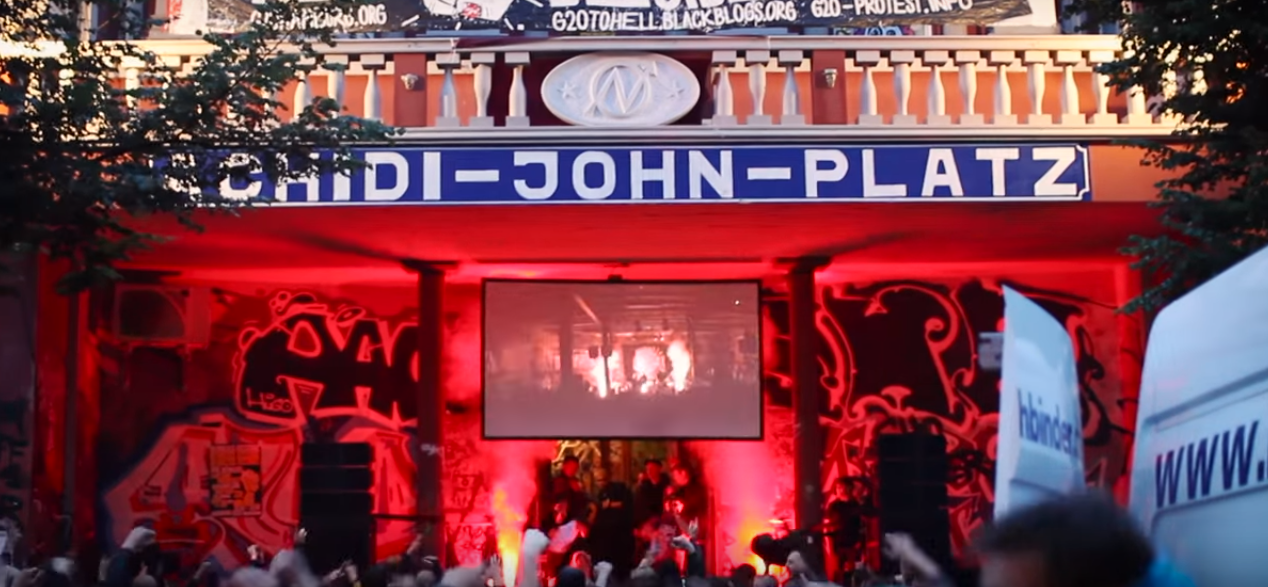
The unofficial street sign of Achidi John Square at Rote Flora

The death of Achidi John occurred while he was in police custody on 12 December 2001, in Hamburg, Germany, due to a combination of a serious heart defect, cocaine use, and the stress caused by emetics forcibly administered by police. Four days earlier, Achidi John had been forcibly administered an emetic to secure evidence of suspected drug trafficking against him. At the political level, the case led to a stop of emetics in Berlin and Lower Saxony. In Bremen, the Greens applied to end the practice of using emetics. The application was rejected. Bremen stopped the use of emetics in 2005 after the similar death of Laye-Alama Condé. In commemoration of the case, the place in front of the Rote Flora has unofficially been named Achidi John Square by left-wing groups.

== Background ==
Achidi John was the alias of Michael Paul Nwabuisi, a Nigerian Igbo. In July 2000, Nwabuisi applied for asylum in Jena. He pretended to be a Cameroonian citizen with the name "Achidi John", born on 6 January 1982. He reasoned that he was under threat of becoming a human sacrifice in Cameroon. The authorities assigned Achidi John to shared accommodation in Ellrich in September 2000. In the asylum procedure, Achidi John stated, among other things, that he had been threatened with death as a human sacrifice in Cameroon and that he had come directly to Hamburg on a ship when he escaped. In January 2001, the asylum application was rejected as unfounded because the alleged information from Achidi John could not be confirmed.

In the following months, Achidi John was arrested five times by the Hamburg police for suspected drug trafficking; but since the trafficking could not be proven, he was released each time.

== Use of emetics against Achidi John ==
On the morning of 8 December 2001, the 19-year-old was picked up by civil investigators in the St. Georg district on suspicion of drug trafficking and immediately taken to the forensic medicine department at Eppendorf University Hospital (UKE). He fiercely opposed the insertion of a nasogastric tube to introduce the emetic ipecac, upon which he was restrained. A doctor then forcibly injected John with the emetic through a tube into his nose. An anesthesiologist was not present to help John in case of an emergency. Then he fell to the ground. The color of his face had changed, breathing and pulse had stopped. After three minutes, two teams of emergency doctors tried unsuccessfully to resuscitate John. John died on 12 December 2001.

In the intensive care unit, Achidi John had 41 pellets of crack cocaine removed from his gastrointestinal tract. After his death, during the autopsy, four more drug pellets were found in his intestines.

Achidi John's autopsy was carried out on December 13, 2001, by the Forensic Medicine Institute of the Free University of Berlin. According to the autopsy report, a combination of a serious heart defect, the use of cocaine, and the stress of administering emetics led to the death of Achidi John.

== Judicial responses ==
The public prosecutor closed a preliminary investigation against those involved in the use of emetics in June 2002. A subsequent enforcement procedure by Achidi John's father was rejected by the Hanseatic Higher Regional Court in July 2003, The case was listed in the 2002 Amnesty International report for Germany.

The Federal Constitutional Court issued a press release the day after Achidi John's death. It pointed out that up to this point in time there had been no decision on whether the administration of so-called emetics was compatible with the constitution. The issue was only brought up once, in 1999, in a constitutional complaint which was not accepted for decision because of the principle of subsidiarity. The court stated that with regard to human dignity and freedom from self-incriminations the use of emetics did not meet any fundamental constitutional concerns. However, an assessment with regard to the protection of physical integrity and the proportionality of the intervention was not made. The compulsory use of emetics to secure evidence in case of ingested drugs was introduced in 2001 by the then red-green senate in Hamburg. A few days before John's death, the coalition of the CDU, FDP and the Party for a Rule of Law Offensive significantly lowered the requirements for the use of emetics. After his death, Frank Ulrich Montgomery, then chair of the Hamburg Medical Association, called on the Senate of Hamburg to end using emetics. In 2006, Germany was sentenced by the European Court of Human Rights to compensation of 10,000 euros for the use of emetics for violating the prohibition of torture and inhumane treatment.
