= List of mass stabbings in Germany =

This is an incomplete list of mass stabbings in Germany. The casualty figures of mass stabbings below include violence-related deaths and injuries with a knife, hatchet and spear respectively, casualty inflicted by legal intervention (i.e., deaths caused by law enforcement and other persons with legal authority to use deadly force acting in the line of duty), as well as suicide. As there is no single, widely accepted definition for how many casualties consitutes a mass stabbing, this article follows the general trend of attacks requiring four or more victims being stabbed.

== Background on crime statistics ==
The list is incomplete, because no federal statistics on all stabbings in Germany are available (unlike for example in the United States, FBI Crime statistics).

The Federal Criminal Police Office started to track solely knife attacks in 2020 and knife attacks are defined as either mere threats with a knife or the actual attacks.

Data from the police crime statistics of individual German states show, that in several states the number of stabbings increased from 2013 to 2018 by over 30%. In 2020 alone, there were at least 100 deaths from nearly 20,000 knife attacks. A large proportion of the crimes are related to domestic violence. The overall number of incidents of intentional simple bodily harm increased by 7.4% from 399,699 in 2022 to 429,157 in 2023. The number of non-German suspects increased more (13%) than the number of German suspects (4%). The highest increase of 20% was in immigrants in Germany, even though they perpetrated only 31.830 out of the 430,000 attacks.

As far as knife attacks are concerned: In 2023, 8,951 cases or 5.8 percent of acts of serious bodily harm (assault) were recorded as "knife attack", a rise in absolute numbers but roughly the same proportion as in 2022 (5.6 percent, altogether 8,160 cases). In 2023, 4,893 cases or 10.9 percent of robberies/theft were knife attacks, an increase in absolute numbers, but an unchanged proportion compared to 2022, with 11.0 percent (4,195 cases).

There is evidence that severe injuries have doubled from 2014 to 2023, per the statistics of the trauma registry of the Deutsche Gesellschaft für Unfallchirurgie (German Association for Trauma Surgery): From 2014 to 2023, 4,917 people with severe knife stab injuries were admitted to German hospitals out of a total of 212,628 admissions to an ICU due to serious injuries. Here, the overall proportion of knife injuries increased sharply from 2014 to 2023, from just under 2 to over 3 %, even though since 2018, patients have to give their written consent in order to be included in the statistics (which caused a high number of unreported cases).

== 1920s and earlier ==
Date	Location	Dead	Injured	Total	Description
4 September 1913	Degerloch, Württemberg	5	0	5	39-year-old Ernst August Wagner killed his wife and 4 children by cutting their throat and chest with a blackjack and dagger. He had paranoia and feared that townsfolk would discover his past acts of bestiality. Hours later he shot 20 people, killing nine.
6 June 1925	Lindenberg, Thuringia, and Hassenberg, Bavaria	9	1	10	Main article: 1925 Hassenberg murders 30-year-old Wilhelm Brückner killed nine family members with an axe and a kitchen knife and afterwards himself. He was previously recorded for mental disability and had an interest in murder cases.

== 1960s ==
Date	Location	Dead	Injured	Total	Description
11 June 1964	Cologne, North Rhine-Westphalia	11	22	33	Main article: Cologne school massacre 57-year-old Walter Seifert attacked a Catholic elementary school with a home-made flamethrower and a spear, killing eight pupils and two teachers, afterwards himself. Was diagnosed with paranoid schizophrenia in 1954.
14 December 1968	Stuttgart, Baden-Württemberg	2	5	7	A Yugoslav guest worker stabbed seven people, killing two, at his guest home. He was killed by police gunfire.

== 1980s ==
Date	Location	Dead	Injured	Total	Description
8 August 1989	Stuttgart, Baden-Württemberg	2	3	5	A 48-year-old Cameroonian failed asylum seeker stabbed five police officers with a bayonet, killing two, before being shot dead by wounded officers. He had been on the run for assaulting a tram employee a few hours earlier.

== 1990s ==
Date	Location	Dead	Injured	Total	Description
13 August 1999	Uelzen, Lower Saxony	2	2	4	A convicted murderer fatally stabbed the deputy director of a prison and a chef and wounded two other prison officials before killing himself.

== 2000s ==
Date	Location	Dead	Injured	Total	Description
16 September 2003	Pforzheim, Baden-Württemberg	1	3	4	A 24-year-old man killed one person and wounded three others with a sword at a mail-order company. He was an alcoholic and presented misanthropy as the motive.
3 April 2005	Stuttgart, Baden-Württemberg	1	3	4	A 25-year-old man stabbed four people with a sword, killing one, during a Tamil Christian church service. He had been in previous conflict with the church over claims that he heard the voice of God.

== 2010s ==
Date	Location	Dead	Injured	Total	Description
17 October 2015	Cologne, North Rhine-Westphalia	0	5	5	A 44-year-old man stabbed mayoral candidate Henriette Reker into the neck at a political information stand in the city, injuring four others. He was a far-right activist who disagreed with Reker's refugee policies.
10 May 2016	Grafing, Bavaria,	1	3	4	Main article: 2016 Munich knife attack A 27-year-old man stabbed four men, killing one, at a train station. Initial hints towards an Islamist background were widely shared online until police identified the man as a schizophrenic with no migrant background.
18 July 2016	between Treuchtlingen and Würzburg, Bavaria	1 (perpetrator)	5	6	Main article: Würzburg train attack A 17-year-old Afghan refugee wanted to avenge the death of a friend in Afghanistan. He had been in contact with the Islamic State.
9 March 2017	Düsseldorf, North Rhine-Westphalia	0	10	10	A 36-year-old Kosovar asylum seeker, who had arrived in Germany in 2009 and was considered mentally ill attacked nine fellow passengers with an axe aboard a train. He jumped from a nearby bridge while attempting to escape capture, injuring himself severely. He was diagnosed with paranoid schizophrenia.
28 July 2017	Barmbek area of Hamburg	1	6	7	26-year-old Ahmad Alhaw, a Palestinian failed asylum seeker took a 20 cm-long kitchen knife from a supermarket shelf to attack several people, killing one. He was known to have had contacts with Salafists, and had psychological and drug problems.
21 October 2017	Munich, Bavaria	0	8	8	34-year-old Patrick H., asked random passers-by if they are clairvoyant and then attacked with a 9 cm-long knife. He was labeled as schizophrenic and was placed in a closed psychiatric clinic.
20 July 2018	Lübeck, Schleswig-Holstein	0	10	10	A 34-year old Iranian-born German man attacked 10 people in a bus in Lübeck with a kitchen knife. He had paranoid schizophrenia.

== 2020s ==
Date	Location	Dead	Injured	Total	Description
25 June 2021	Würzburg, Bavaria	3	8	11	Main article: 2021 Würzburg stabbing A 24-year-old Somali aylum seeker killed three customers at a Woolworth store and wounded seven others. He was cornered by passersby and shot in the leg by police. Initial hints towards an Islamist background were discarded following an investigation, which was followed by a schizophrenia diagnosis while in custody.
25 January 2023	Brokstedt, Schleswig-Holstein	2	7	9	Main article: 2023 Brokstedt train stabbing A 33-year-old Palestinian man stabbed nine people on a moving passenger train, killing two. He had a history of drug abuse and was recently released from a jail sentence.
22 February 2024	Wuppertal, North Rhine-Westphalia	0	5 (including the perpetrator)	5	A 17-year-old male student at the Wilhelm-Dörpfeld secondary school went into the school armed with a knife and a pair of scissors and stabbed multiple pupils and one teacher. A motive was not determined, though the student was judged to have diminished responsibility.
31 May 2024	Mannheim	1	6 (including the perpetrator)	7	Main article: 2024 Mannheim stabbing A 25-year-old Afghan refugee stabbed six people during an anti-Islam rally, killing an intervening police officer. He had becoming a follower of online Islamist groups and was targeting a speaker at the rally.
15 June 2024	Wolmirstedt, Saxony-Anhalt	2 (including the perpetrator)	3	4	An Afghan man stabbed a man to death, then ran into an UEFA Euro 2024 watch party and injured three people before being shot and killed by police. The initial victim was a fellow Afghan, with political or religious motives, as well as drug use, being ruled out.
23 August 2024	Solingen, North Rhine-Westphalia	3	8	11	Main article: 2024 Solingen stabbing A 26-year-old Syrian refugee stabbed 11 people (three of whom died) during a festival. He had pledged allegiance to the Islamic State, which claimed the attack.
31 August 2024	Siegen, North Rhine-Westphalia	0	6	6	A 32-year-old woman stabbed and injured six people on a bus. She was subdued by other passengers. She had untreated mental health issues and stated that the stabbing was meant to attract attention to her latest rejection for a therapy request.
22 January 2025	Aschaffenburg, Bavaria	2	3	5	Main article: 2025 Aschaffenburg stabbing A 28-year-old Afghan man attacked people in Schöntal Park, killing a man and a toddler. Two adults were injured when they tried to stop the attacker. A two-year-old girl was also injured in the attack. He had schizophrenia and stated that voices commanded him to kill children.
18 May 2025	Bielefeld, North Rhine-Westphalia	0	4	4	Main article: 2025 Bielefeld stabbing attack A Syrian man stabbed five people during a watch party outside a bar. He had pledged allegiance to the Islamic State.
23 May 2025	Altstadt, Hamburg	0	15	15	Main article: 2025 Hamburg stabbing attack A woman stabbed fifteen people at the central train station, with four having life-threatening injuries and another three having heavy injuries. She had schizophrenia and was released from a psychiatric hospital day before.

== See also ==
- Stabbing as a terrorist tactic
