= 2025 Mannheim car attack =

Vehicle-ramming in Baden-Württemberg, Germany

- Location: Paradeplatz, Mannheim, Germany
- Date: 3 March 2025; 19 months ago 12:14 p.m. (CET)
- Target: Pedestrians
- Attack type: Vehicle-ramming attack, shooting
- Weapons: 2002 Ford Fiesta; Reck Miami 92F gas pistol
- Deaths: 2
- Injuries: 15 (including the perpetrator)
- Perpetrator: Alexander Scheuermann
- Motive: Frustration about familial and romantic relationships
- Convictions: Murder x2 Attempted murder x6
- Judge: Gerd Rackwitz

On 3 March 2025, a vehicle-ramming attack took place in Mannheim, Baden-Württemberg, Germany. Alexander Scheuermann drove his car into a crowd at Paradeplatz, a popular pedestrian area, killing two people and injuring fourteen others.

Scheuermann fled the scene, but was stopped by an intervening taxi. After firing on the taxi driver and arriving police with a gas pistol, he attempted suicide by gunshot before being apprehended by officers.

Baden-Württemberg Police stated that he had psychiatric problems and that there was "no indication" of a political or religious motive. Scheuermann said he was motivated by familal and romantic problems, with the main cause behind the attack being attributed to a borderline personality disorder diagnosed in custody. In December 2025, Scheuermann was convicted of murder and sentenced to life imprisonment.

== Background ==
Germany was celebrating Rosenmontag or Rose Monday, a carnival held before Ash Wednesday and the beginning of Lent, causing German police to be on high alert.

Prior to the attack, there had been two high-profile car-rammings in Germany, one in Magdeburg in December 2024 and one in Munich in February 2025. Due to security concerns, official Rosenmontag celebrations had already been cancelled in several German major cities, including Mannheim, although parade marches had taken place on the weekend for Tulpensonntag and a Fasnacht market was scheduled to take place on 4 March. As no special events had been planned for the day, no bollards or other barriers were put in place, the situation preceding the incident being described as "a regular day of urban life in Mannheim".

== Incident ==
The incident took place at 12:14. Surveillance footage showed Scheuermann, driving his black 2002 Ford Fiesta in Mannheim's inner city centre ring, making a turn into the Planken shopping lane, accelerating to at least 60 km/h. Scheuermann drove into a group of people sat on a bench inside the pedestrian zone in Paradeplatz, hitting several of them. Eyewitnesses reported a chaotic scene, with multiple victims lying on the ground. Mannheim Police Chief Ulrike Schäfer was at the square and stated that she had seen one person flung 50 metres (160 ft) from the impact.

As Scheuermann continued to drive through the inner city, Afzal Muhammad, an off-duty taxi driver who had witnessed the collision, followed him. Muhammad is credited with saving lives by warning pedestrians with shouting and honking. While attempting to shake off the pursuer, Scheuermann crashed into a cul-de-sac wall in sector E7 and was blocked from reversing out by the taxi. He exited the car and fired a gunshot at Muhammad before fleeing on foot. Police found the abandoned car at 12:26. Scheuermann was arrested at 12:43, near the Rheinbrücke at Mannheim Harbour, after he shot himself in the mouth with a gas pistol. Afterwards, he reportedly asked to be shot by the arresting officers.

Scheuermann initially refused to provide any information to authorities about the attack. Police seized a gun, written documents and digital data carriers, which were held for analysis. Scheuermann did not have a permit for the blank-firing pistol used in the attack at the time of the incident. A handwritten note was found taped to his car’s dashboard, containing reminders for left-right distinction and "mathematical formulas for reaction distance, braking distance and stopping distance". Due to the self-inflicted injury to his mouth, he was brought to a hospital for treatment and taken into police custody the following day. An interrogation was postponed until he became capable of speech again.

Following the attack, the city's hospital declared a state of emergency, and authorities advised residents to avoid the downtown area of Mannheim during the emergency response.

== Victims ==
Two people, an 83-year-old woman and a 54-year-old man, were killed. Baden-Württemberg LKA reported the number of injured as 11, including five seriously, which was revised to 14 on 5 March. Ten of them were locals to Mannheim while the remaining four were from Ludwigshafen. They were aged 2 to 62.

The injured were treated at University Hospital Mannheim, Theresien Hospital, and University Hospital Heidelberg. As of 6 March, all but one were released from hospital.

== Perpetrator ==
The perpetrator was Alexander Scheuermann, a 40-year-old German citizen from the neighbouring city of Ludwigshafen. Within hours of the attack, State Minister of the Interior Thomas Strobl announced that there was nothing to indicate a religious or political extremist motive, with preliminary findings pointing to a potential mental illness. However, police also confirmed that Scheuermann had past ties to German far-right political groups. Two weeks after the attack, on 19 March 2025, it was stated that investigation had not ruled out a political motive, albeit unlikely, after images of Scheuermann surfaced attending an NPD protest march in October 2018.

Scheuermann had been in psychiatric treatment for several years, last in August 2024, after he poured gasoline over himself and made an unsuccessful attempt at self-immolation in order to receive stationary treatment at a hospital in Ludwigshafen. According to state prosecutor Romeo Schüssler, Scheuermann had been previously convicted of assault, drunk driving, and hate speech between 2008 and 2018. In December 2009, Scheuermann attacked a woman with an electroshock weapon after luring her into his car in Altenkirchen. This did not result in imprisonment due to "significantly reduced criminal responsibility", but later contributed to a three-month sentence following an arrest in September 2010, for carrying a gas pistol without a licence inside the courtyard of a gymnasium in Ladenburg. Scheuermann has been linked to "Ring Bund", a neo-Nazi arms trafficking group shut down in 2022, which had been based out of Bavaria and associated with the Reichsbürger movement.

== Custody and legal proceedings ==
As of 27 March 2025, Scheuermann has refused to talk to investigators. A psychiatric evaluation was issued, with psychiatrist Harald Dreßing determining that while Scheuermann was criminally responsible, he did have a pathological disorder, later specified as borderline personality disorder.

On 31 October 2025, Scheuermann's trial began at the Regional Court of Mannheim, on counts of murder and attempted murder. Scheuermann has declined to make any statements in court, but according to his attorney, his client was motivated by anger and self-doubt due to having wasted an inheritance. Scheuermann had thus planned the car attack as a method of suicide, with the initial target of Offenbach, but spontaneously decided to make the attempt while driving through Mannheim instead. The defence argued that there was no killing intent and that Scheuermann's perception ceased at the beginning of the attack. Although Scheuermann's ties to the far-right were proven by investigation, a political motive was discarded by the prosecution based on statements made by Scheuermann, who cited personal issues. A letter written by Scheuermann to his father professed that he committed the attack out of hatred for his father, who resided in Offenbach, and others, having planned the attack after being romantically rejected by a friend. A psychiatrist stated that the defendant's actions were "only explainable through mental illness".

After thirteen court appearances, the verdict was read on 18 December 2025, one day ahead of the scheduled date, sentencing Scheuermann to life imprisonment at a psychiatric prison facility. Reduced culpability due to the defendant's borderline personality disorder was recognised, but did not affect criminal punishment.

== Aftermath ==
On the evening of 3 March 2025, Federal Minister of the Interior Nancy Faeser (SPD), Baden-Württemberg's Prime Minister Winfried Kretschmann (B90/Greens), State Minister of the Interior Thomas Strobl (CDU) and Mannheim's Mayor Christian Specht (CDU) expressed their dismay in Mannheim.

Prime Minister of Italy Giorgia Meloni and President of France Emmanuel Macron offered condolences.

Singer Maite Kelly cancelled a concert that was scheduled for 5 March "out of respect for the victims".

Afzal Muhammad was widely praised for his intervention and credited with stopping the perpetrator, receiving personal thanks from Mayor Specht. Muhammad stated that his actions were not heroic and that he had only acted in accordance with his beliefs as an Ahmadi Muslim. During his testimony at the perpetrator's trial, Muhammad stated that being shot at caused him anxiety attacks, preventing him from working for two months after the incident. On 6 July 2026, Muhammad was awarded a certificate of thanks by Mayor Specht during the annual New Year's reception at the Mannheimer Rosengarten. On 28 July 2026, Muhammad was awarded a Baden-Württemberg Rescue Medal by Deputy Minister-President and Interior Minister Manuel Hagel.

Throughout the week, state authorities deployed 55 pastoral counselors (Seelsorger) of various religions for Mannheim citizens. By the beginning of the following week, Baden-Württemberg extended the program due to high usage. On 10 March, an ecumenical and interreligious remembrance service, number 1,500 attendants, was held at Paradeplatz. Following the trial, Mayor Specht repeated his thanks to the first responders and pastoral counselors in a public address.

On 14 March, a discussion about the attack in an internal affairs meeting in the Bundestag was delayed in favour of discussing a basic law amendment for the debt brake. Thomas Strobl defended police's statements about a presumed mental illness rather than political motive despite the perpetrator's right-wing involvement.

The city of Mannheim opened a donation account, collecting €9,000 by October 2025. On 17 March, a memorial plaque was built at a nearby green space. On the first anniversary of the attack in 2026, an interreligious remembrance service by about 200 residents was held at Paradeplatz, where the victims and the first responders, including Afzal Muhammad, were honored by Mayor Christian Specht and State Minister of the Interior Thomas Strobl.

=== Media ===
There was widespread online misinformation following the attack. On WhatsApp, fake voice messages were spread claiming that a group of five to seven men were committing additional attacks, attributing false reports of a shooting and a stabbing in other parts of Mannheim to them. After it was announced that the arrested suspect was a German citizen, Telegram users disseminated the identity card and driver's licence of an unrelated 33-year-old Heidelberg resident with a Lebanese surname, falsely claimed to be those of the perpetrator. Similarly, a fake document was spread as an internal police memo, claiming that the suspect had a "dark skin type", also including an incorrect vehicle plate. Twitter users later edited the images of the personal documents below a cut-off FOCUS Online headline to make it appear as if it were part of a legitimate article. Although the falsely accused man's initials did not match the perpetrator's name, the false claim was spread on TikTok and presented as fact by social media accounts of the AfD's Hanover branch and the Russian newspaper Pravda. AfD politician Maximilian Krah made a post stating "Mass immigration is deadly" shortly after the attack. AfD Bundestag member Nicole Höchst posted a photo from the arrest of the Afghan suspect in the earlier Munich car attack and falsely claimed it to be that of the Mannheim perpetrator. Agence France-Presse reached out to Baden-Württemberg Police and the state prosecutor's office, who confirmed that the documents circulating online had no connection to the perpetrator or anyone connected to the car attack. Baden-Württemberg LKA launched investigations into hate speech in response to the misinformation. State Minister Strobl made a public statement urging the public to await the end of investigations for a motive, also criticising the "political cannibalization" of the attack regarding claims of either a right-wing motive or that the perpetrator was a foreigner.

Although initial comparisons were drawn to the earlier Munich and Magdeburg car attacks, some media have since criticised waning reporting of the Mannheim car incident since 5 March. Overall interest and attention was significantly lower following the identification of the suspect, and unlike in the direct aftermath of the Munich car-ramming, Chancellor Olaf Scholz did not visit the site. It was noted that similar had occurred with the 2018 Münster attack, the 2019 Essen-Bottrop-Oberhausen attack, the Volkmarsen and Trier attacks in 2020 and the 2022 Berlin car attack, despite higher casualties, in either fatalities or injuries.

== See also ==
- 1982 Mannheim attack
- 2024 Mannheim stabbing
- 2025 Aschaffenburg stabbing attack
- 2025 Vancouver car attack
