= Munich attack =

Munich attack may refer to:

- 1970 Munich bus attack, gun attack on El Al flight passengers by Palestinian militants
- 1970 arson attack on a Jewish retirement home in Munich
- 1972 Munich massacre, Israeli Olympic athletes killed by Black September militants
- 1980 Oktoberfest bombing, neo-Nazi's bomb exploded prematurely; unclear motive
- 2016 Munich knife attack, by a mentally disturbed person at a Bavarian railway station
- 2016 Munich shooting, mass shooting in a shopping mall
- 2024 Munich shooting, near the Israeli consulate and Nazi Documentation Centre, by an Islamic extremist
- 2025 Munich car attack, vehicle ramming at a trade union demonstration; unclear motive
