= Omarzai =

Omarzai is a surname

- Clan of Rind (tribe)
- Azmatullah Omarzai, Afghan cricketer
- Enamullah Omarzai, 2025 Aschaffenburg stabbing suspect

== See also ==
- Umarzai
- Mohammadzai
