= Migration from Ghana to Germany =

The migration of Ghanaians to Germany started in the early 1950s when a West Germany policy permitted the travel of students from some African countries to Germany to further their education. This policy was to equip the students with knowledge which would be useful in their country of origin when they eventually returned.

As of 2009, there were about 40,000 "Ghanaians with a migration background" in Germany; where "Ghanaians with a migration background" means "naturalised persons of Ghanaian origin" and "the second and third generation of Ghanaians naturalised in Germany and the children from binational partnerships who did not immigrate on their own," according to Deutsche Gesellschaft fur Technische Zusammenarbeit (GTZ).

According to GTZ, there is a sizeable number of undocumented migrants, most of whom arrive in Germany with a valid visa but remain without a residence permit after the allowed time has elapsed.

== Causes and motives for migration ==
Economic hardships, wars, tribal conflicts and life struggles have been the reason a lot of people have left their country of origin. Refugee status in the world has hit an alarming rate and it increases each year. Economic reasons, the high rate of poverty and the high population rate are among other reasons that influence people to leave their homes or country of origin.

== Types of Ghana to Germany migration ==
Three types of migration can be seen in the history of Ghanaians migrating to Germany. They include educational migration, asylum-seeking migration, and migration for family reunification. Ghanaian migrants are rarely granted employment visas.

=== Educational migration ===
Many education migrants migrate to third countries after they complete their studies in Germany.

=== Asylum-seeking migration ===
Migrants under this umbrella end up as those who permanently reside in Germany today.

Since the 1970s, Economic hardships and political violence during military regimes in Ghana expanded the number of Ghanaian refugees who have asked asylum in European and African countries.

The acceptance quotas for political refugees from Ghana have continuously been below one percent, as authorities classify most Ghanaian migrants as economic refugees. Only 112 persons between 1983 and 2007 have been accepted as political refugees.

=== Family reunification ===
Migrants under this umbrella end up as those who permanently reside in Germany today. Over one-quarter of the Ghanaian migrants come to Germany through family reunification.

== Regular and irregular migration to Germany ==
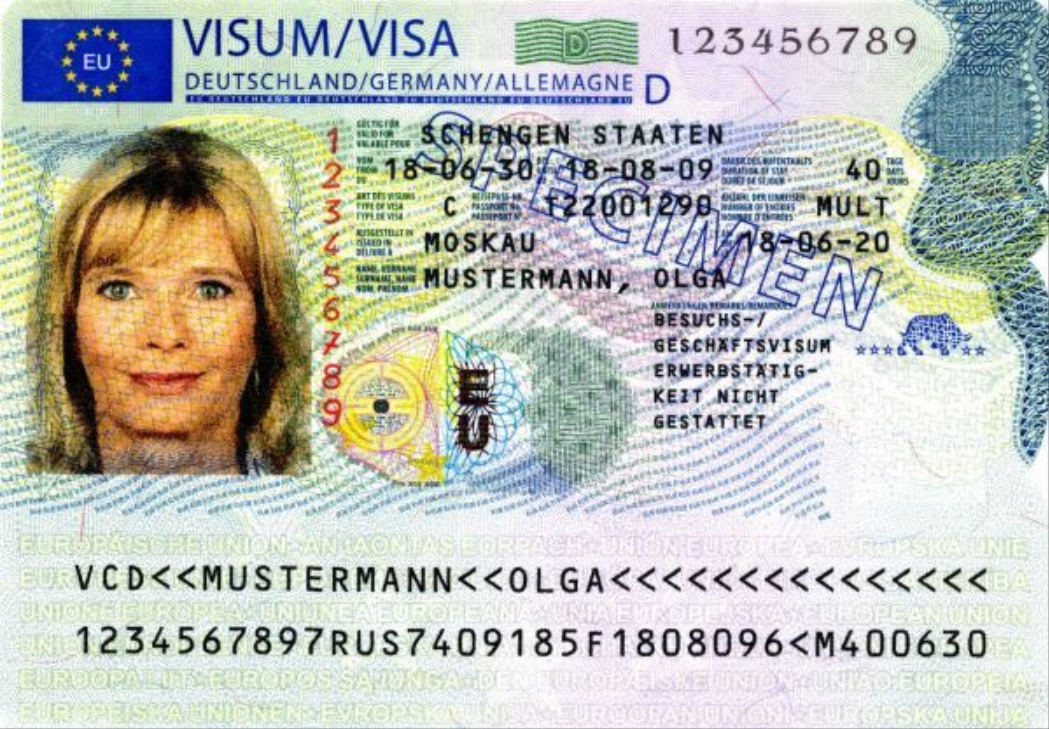
Specimen of a German Schengen visa

International Organization for Migration defines regular migration as migration that occurs in compliance with the laws of the country of origin, transit, and destination. IOM also defines irregular migration as the movement of persons that takes place outside the laws, regulations, or international agreements governing the entry into or exit from the State of origin, transit, or destination.

There are pathways for migration for both regular and irregular movements.

=== Regular pathways ===
Federal Foreign Office of Germany suggests various methods for safe and legal migration depending on a migrants reason for movement. Regular means involve getting a visa.

==== Short stay visas ====
The German embassy prescribes the acquisition of a Schengen visa for short stays (up to 90 days within a period of 180 days) in Germany (and European countries within the Schengen area) for tourism, visit or business purposes. Applicants are required to fill a visa form and book an appointment. The embassy in Accra offers a checklist of documents needed for the visa interview.

==== Long term visas ====
The embassy also prescribes the long stay visas for students, family reunions, employment visas among others, and gives their requirements.

==== General visa requirements and cost ====
Applicants must have a passport with validity of exceeding the duration of intended stay in Germany by at least 3 months. This passport must contain at least 2 blank pages and must have been issued within the past 10 years. The applicant also needs their original birth certificate and 1 recent passport picture with white background. A EuroTravel health insurance, covering entire duration of stay and valid for all Schengen States is required. Lastly, proof of sufficient financial means for intended stay will also be inspected. The applicant will sign the declaration according to Sec. 54 Par. 2 No. 8 of the German Residence Act. The visa processing costs 60.00 Euros.

==== Additional requirements depending on the purpose of the trip ====
For visitor visas, proof of family relation is needed. The host must sign an invitation letter and give a copy of his or her passport and residence permit to the applicant. For medical treatment, applicants must prove they have sufficient financial means for treatment and costs of living plus a letter from a local doctor stating the diagnosis. Applicants also need a statement from the German hospital or doctor agreeing to treat the patient.

For business, applicants must have an invitation letter from the company in Germany and a letter from the company in the country of residence stating the purpose of the trip. The German company must be in the national commercial register.

For training/internship or language courses, applicants must have a letter from the German institution confirming their registration and documents that prove payment of the course and information on duration.

For visas for culture, sports, film crew, or religious purposes, applicants must hold a letter from the authorities with details on the activities and team involved.

=== Irregular migration ===
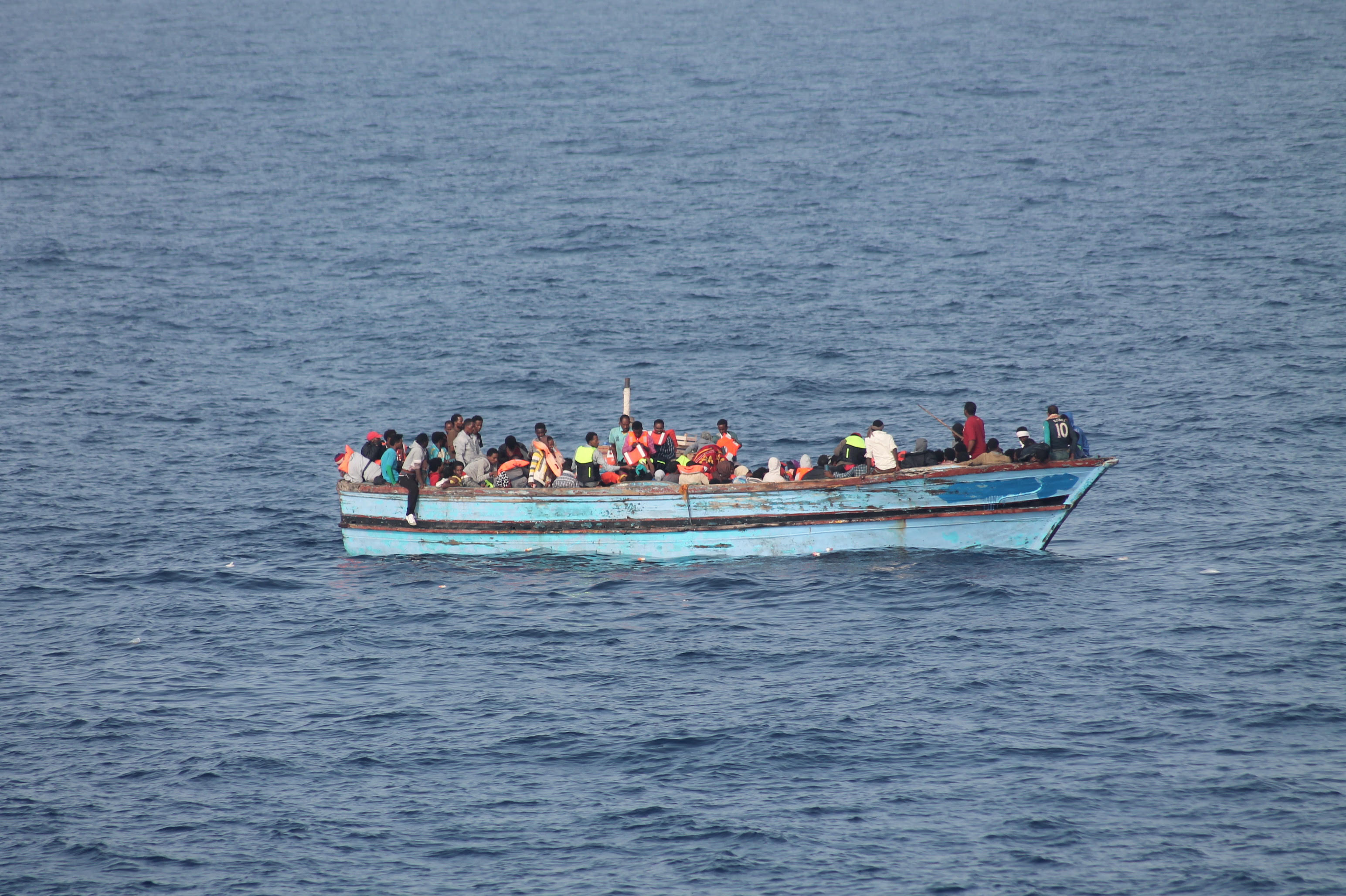
A boat with migrants, off the Libyan coast

Immigration from Africa to Europe through illegal means is significant. Most migrants who go on such journeys are from underdeveloped African countries looking for greener pastures in Europe. Migrants usually go to North Africa, especially Libya, which has become the primary departure point for making illegal entry into Europe. From Libya, they go by boat via the Mediterranean Sea. Some migrants also go by land through the Spanish Enclaves of Ceuta and Melilla, risking severe injury and even death. Human traffickers and human smugglers have taken advantage of the situation to cash in, often lying to migrants about opportunities in Europe.

By June 2019 IOM statistics indicated that deaths recorded on the three main Mediterranean Sea routes to Italy, Malta and Cyprus by June 2019 are at 555 people. By December 2019, the number rose to 738 with drowning, physical abuse, sexual abuse, starvation, sickness and lack of access to healthcare and dehydration are top causes of death.

Ghanaians are reported to rank highly among migrants hoping to get to Europe though the country is more peaceful and politically stable than other countries where migrants originate. About 5,636 Ghanaians reached Italy by boat in 2016. In 2017, the Brong-Ahafo region, now divided into three regions of Ahafo, Brong, and Bono East, had the highest number of migrants. Out of 4,092 Ghanaian returnees from Libya, the highest number of 1,562, representing 38.17 percent, were from Brong Ahafo. Ashanti Region had 601, indicating 13.63 percent.

== Receipt of migrants in Germany ==
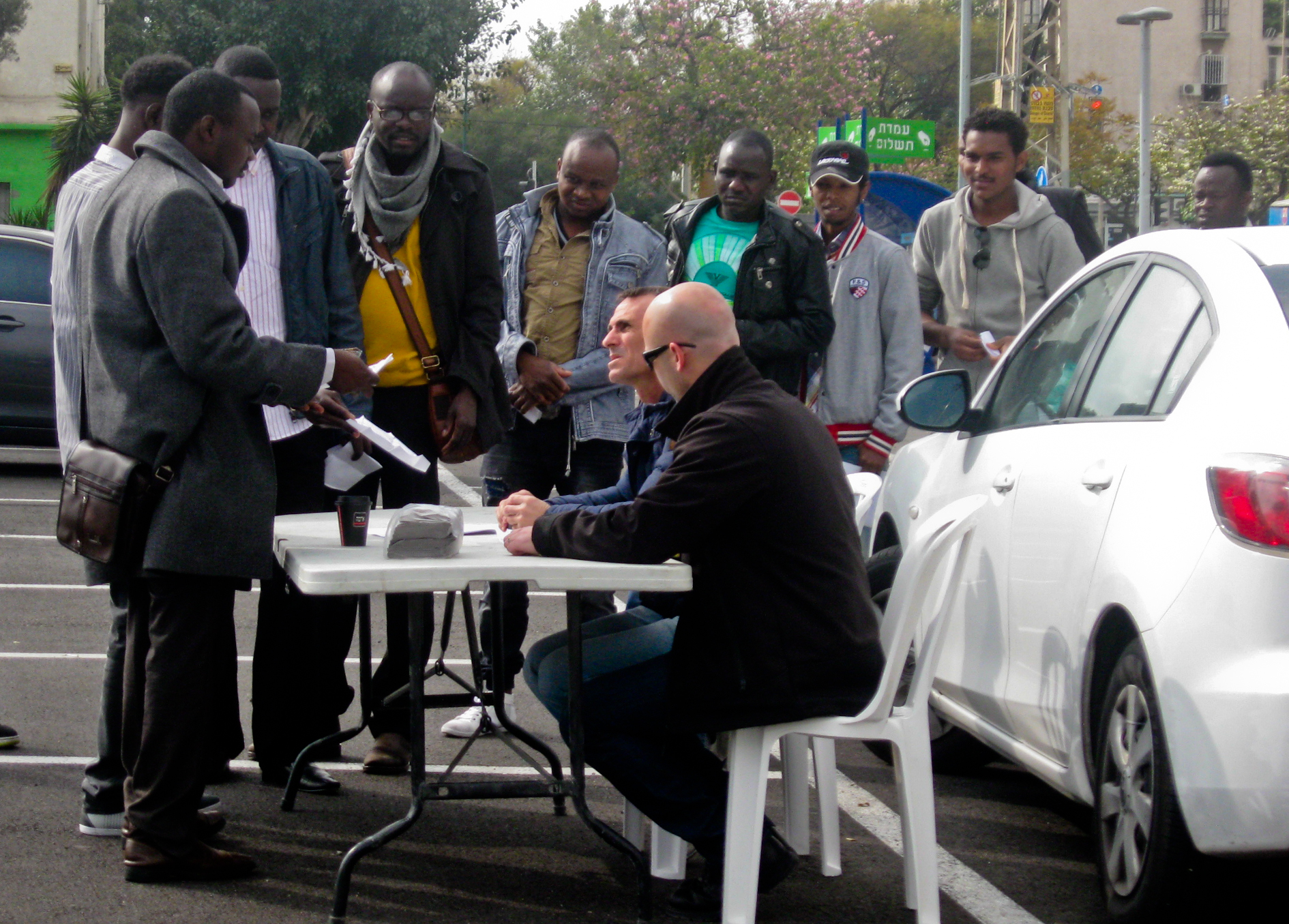
Deportation of African asylum seekers

Many people who end up seeking to stay in Germany get deported because their claim for asylum, the right to be reunited with family, are unsuccessful. Only asylum seekers who receive one of the four forms of protection are given the right to stay. The four forms include Refugee Protection, Entitlement to Asylum, Subsidiary Protection, and National ban on Forced Return. Usually, successful seekers are those who can't provide evidence of persecution in their country of origin and other serious challenges back home. People who come to Germany to improve their economic situation are not refugees. Additionally, moving from one EU country to the other does not permit the application for asylum again in another EU country.

Germany also grants assisted voluntary return for some migrants.
