= 2021 Würzburg stabbing =

Mass stabbing in Bavaria, Germany

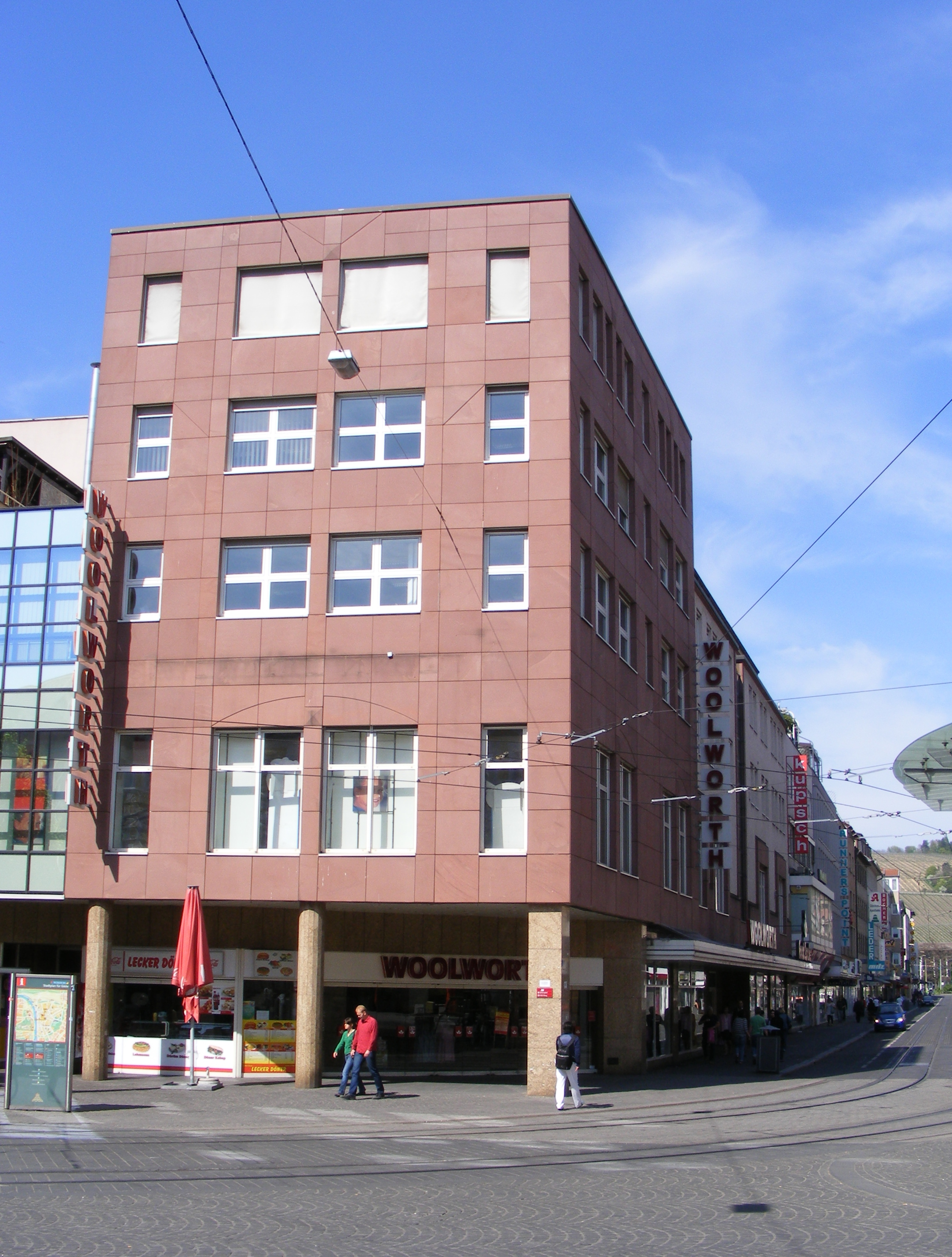
- The Woolworth store in Würzburg before 2011
- Location: Barbarossaplatz; Würzburg, Bavaria, Germany
- Date: 25 June 2021; 5 years ago c. 17:00 – c. 17:04 (CEST)
- Target: Shoppers and pedestrians
- Attack type: Mass stabbing
- Weapon: Kitchen knife
- Deaths: 3
- Injuries: 10 (including the perpetrator)
- Perpetrator: Abdirahman Jibril Ali
- Charges: Murder x3 Attempted murder x6 Attempted manslaughter x4 Dangerous bodily harm Serious bodily harm Intentional bodily harm
- Verdict: Not criminally responsible
- Judge: Thomas Schuster

On 25 June 2021, a mass stabbing took place at a Woolworth store in Würzburg, Bavaria, Germany. Three women were killed and eight others were injured before the perpetrator, 31-year-old Abdirahman Jibril Ali, was cornered by armed bystanders and arrested by police after being shot in the leg.

Jibril Ali, originally from Somalia, had a history of several violent altercations since his 2015 arrival as an asylum seeker in Germany and several involuntary commitments before the attack. Islamist motives were initially suspected due to statements made by Jibril Ali during the attack, but later discarded due to a lack of reliable evidence. In 2022, the perpetrator was found not criminally responsible due to paranoid schizophrenia and sentenced to indefinite psychiatric commitment.

== Attack ==
On 25 June 2021, at about 17:00 local time, the attacker entered a Woolworth shop on Barbarossaplatz in central Altstadt borough of Würzburg. He asked a 39-year-old shop assistant in which part of the store the knives were displayed. He grabbed a knife with a 33-cm blade from the kitchen section, wounding the shop assistant before repeatedly slashing at a 27-year-old woman nearby, who was trying to open a locked emergency exit. The victim fended him off with a basket, after which he killed a woman in the dress section, then attacked a mother-daughter pair in the women's underwear department. The mother and a customer who attempted to intervene were killed. The 11-year-old child fled towards the entrance of the store, where she and another shop employee were attacked. The perpetrator had attacked most victims from behind, with witnesses describing his gaze as switching between "hateful and indifferent".

The attacker then exited the store and began attacking pedestrians on the street, first stabbing and critically injuring a 16-year-old boy, who was unaware of the attack due to wearing headphones and a hoodie. Outside a bank, the attacker injured a man and a woman. The mall detective ran after the attacker, shouting his location to bystanders, with at least sixteen people joining the chase. Several of the group, mostly young men, armed themselves with makeshift weapons such as brooms, wooden sticks, and chairs from nearby restaurants. The group eventually cornered the attacker in a closed-off alley in Oberthürstraße. A teenager attempted to calm the attacker down in Somali, while several others rendered first aid to the injured on the street. Arriving police officers moved in to arrest the attacker, who then lunged at them. One officer fired a single gunshot, wounding the attacker in the thigh, allowing for his arrest. The stabbing lasted four minutes.

== Victims ==
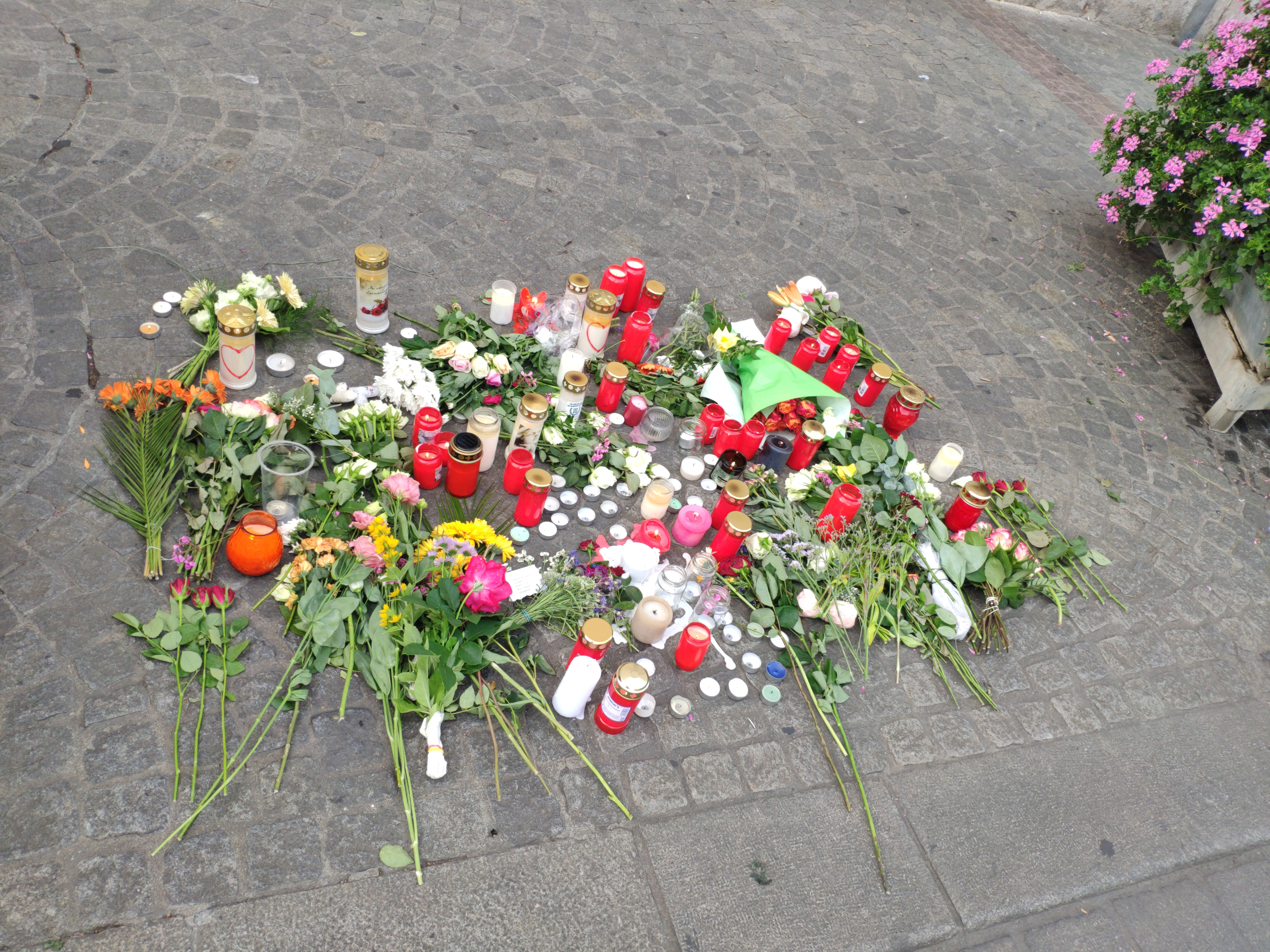
Flowers for the victims

Three people, all women, were killed and died at the scene inside the shop. 24-year-old Steffi W. was killed while buying a dress at the shop for her friend's wedding. 49-year-old Christiane H., a Brazilian-German citizen who had moved to the country in early 2021, died shielding her daughter. 82-year-old Johanna H. was killed when she tried to help the mother and child.

Initially, seven injured were counted, three of whom were injured inside the store. By the time of the trial in 2022, the number of injured was updated to nine. Six of them had life-threatening wounds while the other three had light injuries. Two victims, an adult and a teenager, were male while six others, four women, a teenager, and a pre-teen, were female. One of those counted as injured, the attacked police officer, did not have any physical wounds. All victims were stabbed in the head, neck and/or upper torso.

== Perpetrator ==
In accordance with German privacy laws, the perpetrator was identified as Abdirahman Jibril A. with the press department of Landgericht Würzburg identifying him as Jibril Ali during his trial. Born in Mogadishu, he arrived in Italy as an asylum seeker in early 2015 and moved to Germany in May 2015. He was generally reported to be 24 years old with the birth year 1997. In custody and at his later trial, Jibril Ali stated that he was born in December 1989, making him 31 years old at the time of the attack.

Jibril Ali filed for asylum in Germany on 21 May 2015, reasoning in his request in Chemnitz that he had fled due to threats by Al-Shabaab, claiming to have foiled a hand grenade attack. The application was denied, but he received subsidiary protection due to his claim of prosecution in Somalia. He lived in Saxony as a regular resident from 2015 until 2019.

Jibril Ali was first arrested by law enforcement in late 2015, when he was accused of attacking another resident at his refugee accommodation with a knife. Since both he and the other man involved had light cuts and provided contradictory testimony, assault charges were dropped.

In August 2018, Jibril Ali and an Afghan friend reported that they were attacked by neo-Nazis in Chemnitz. The men claimed that a group of masked individuals beat and slashed at them and that they might have been associated with a right-wing protest that took place at the crime scene earlier that day. Jibril Ali had injuries consistent with the described assault, but no suspects were ever arrested.

In 2019, he had drawn the attention of authorities due to violent altercations, and had been forced into a psychiatric hospital a month before the attack, after he stopped a random car in the street and sat in it. However, he was discharged a day later as no mental illness was diagnosed. In September 2019, he was moved to a homeless shelter in Würzburg. In January 2021, he threatened a shelter staff member and other asylum seekers with a knife. Since then, he was recorded as living on the streets, ignoring psychiatric appointments, aid programs, and calls by social workers. Jibril Ali was repeatedly noted for erratic behavior, usually aimlessly wandering barefoot through town.

In January 2021, another Somali asylum seeker denounced Jibril Ali to the German authorities, saying that Jibril Ali had told him in private conversation that he was "an al-Shabaab member, who killed civilians, journalist and police officers in Somalia" between 2008 and 2009. The source said that he had overheard Jibril Ali stating this during a phone conversation he overheard from another room six years earlier in 2015. After this claim, an investigation was opened, but it could not confirm the allegation. Jibril Ali had previously told an imam that he worked for the secret service of Russia and the United States, telling other Somali countrymen that he believed he was being followed by Germany's secret service.

=== Investigation ===
There is no evidence of an accomplice, and the perpetrator appears to have operated alone.

Police suspected Islamic extremism without confirming an official motive, with Bavaria's interior minister Joachim Herrmann describing the suspicions as "blatant". The Woolworth's store detective, some police officers and a number of witnesses reported hearing the attacker shout ʾAllāhu ʾakbar at least twice while committing the attack, and after the arrest he said that the attack was 'his jihad'. By August 2021, the Bundestag wrote that Munich's public prosecutor's office and Bavaria's LKA were no longer suspecting terrorist or extremist motives, nor did they believe in a planned attack or involvement of third parties, based on extensive searches of the perpetrator's lodgings and phone records. Their findings instead suggested that the perpetrator was potentially not criminally responsible at the time the crimes were carried out due to a mental disorder. Additionally, it was found that the perpetrator had already been in psychiatric holding five times since his arrival in Germany, with a record for hallucinations and delusions, as well as noted for substance abuse of heroin, crystal meth, cannabis, and alcohol.

A police spokesman said that, while the attacker had a criminal record, none of his previous offences were related to terrorism. Investigators who checked his room for more evidence had not found any Islamic State's material or religious extremist slogans.

As of 29 June 2021, police were also investigating if his release from psychiatric care was premature; however the suspect had not been diagnosed with a mental disorder. Police investigation discounted an Islamist motive as unsubstantiated. By October 2021, a psychiatric evaluation stated that the perpetrator may not be criminally responsible due to delusions; it was eventually concluded that Jibril Ali had previously undiagnosed paranoid schizophrenia and that the condition affected his actions in the attack. In November 2021, Jibril Ali, now under prescribed medication, voiced regret for the attack in psychiatric holding.

=== Trial and custody ===
On 22 April 2022, Jibril Ali was charged with three counts of murder, eleven counts of attempted murder and dangerous bodily harm by Landgericht Würzburg. The defence said Jibril Ali was going through a stage of psychosis and was convinced to perform the stabbing through auditory hallucination. Jibril Ali apologised in court and stated that voices in his head had told him to "kill everyone in the shop, then outside". Two assessors again stated that the defendant was likely not criminally responsible and would pose a "lasting danger" to the public on account of his mental state. The prosecution argued that while Jibril Ali did not have terrorist motives, he had acted out of resentment against the German state for perceived mistreatment. The trial was set to run until September 2022. In July 2022, the trial ended prematurely after 15 court dates without imposing a criminal sentence, as the court decided that Jibril Ali would be placed in a psychiatric institution for an indefinite amount of time. The court determined that the defendant not criminally responsible due to being in a state of delusion during the stabbing and that he had not acted with any personal or political motive.

In May 2025, it was announced that there were plans to deport Jibril Ali back to Somalia, in part due to the severity of his crimes and his refusal to participate in therapy. There were concerns that he would either travel back to Germany after his deportation or pose a threat to others in Somalia, due to which a potential deportation was rejected in October 2025.

== Aftermath ==
Bavarian Minister-President Markus Söder declared three days of mourning, with flags at half-staff. Memorial services were held in Würzburg.

Initial suspicions of an Islamic act of terror by police were widely reported in media. Press and Information Office spokesperson Steffen Seibert emphasised that the investigation's state at the time was based only on speculation. A few days after the attack, while investigations were still ongoing, Jörg Meuthen, co-leader of the Alternative for Germany (AfD), presented the suspected Islamist motive to promote anti-immigration policies. The claim was criticized by the Christian Democratic Union of Germany (CDU), including Würzburg's mayor Christian Schuchardt, who wrote an open letter to the city's citizens that "the crimes of single perpetrators should never be grossly applied to entire ethnic groups, religions, or nationalities", saying that Somalis and refugees in general shouldn't be subjected to collectively condemnation. Susanne Hennig-Wellsow, chairwoman of Die Linke, said that AfD was politically instrumentalising the crime to spread "inhuman propaganda" ('menschenverachtende Propaganda').

The citizens who intervened in the attack were celebrated by the press as heroes. In November 2021, five of them were honored for civil courage by the state of Bavaria. Mall detective Hossein Moradi, Chia Rabiei (42), Peter Thoma-Vogt and Ahmed Hirsi Mohamed (19), each received a Bavarian Rescue Medal for directly engaging the perpetrator, while Jens Kleefeld (28) received a Christopherus Medal for providing first aid during the situation. Media later noted that three of those honored were immigrants (two from Iran and one from Somalia). At the one-year anniversary in 2022, three other helpers, along with three of the previously honored (Moradi, Rabiei, and Mohamed), were given Bavarian Order of Merit medals by the city of Würzburg through the mayor and second mayor, with Söder cancelling on short notice as the presiding politician. One of the recipients, shopkeeper Gabi Marx who was wounded protecting the injured 11-year-old, later travelled to the United States to leave her medal at the grave of her idol, Elvis Presely, on his death day on 16 August. In March 2023, another nine people were commemorated by the city of Würzburg.

Three of the men who physically confronted the attacker received the most attention by media due to giving media interviews. Rabiei, a Christian Kurd asylum seeker from Mahabad who fended off the attacker by beating him with a backpack, was the most prominent of these, also receiving a XY-Award. There were also calls to award Rabiei German citizenship, but this did not occur. In spring 2023, he was slated for deportation to Iran. Rabiei subsequently won an appeal to stay in Germany based on concerns over persecution by the Iranian government. 19-year-old soldier Elvis Dick, a Volga German, received a Cross of Honour of the Bundeswehr in December 2021. The remaining man, then 50-year-old wine bar waiter Helmuth Wulff, received a commendation through Söder in 2023, after being one of nine helpers who were recognised as having been not previously honored in 2021.

Psychotherapist Marion Schowalter, who had several people psychologically affected by the stabbing as clients, established a trauma clinic in Würzburg in coordination with other therapists and city officials to organise long-term therapy appointments survivors and witnesses of such attacks with therapy places withina short time. The network was credited with providing therapy to those affected by the 2025 mass stabbing in nearby Aschaffenburg within two weeks.

== See also ==
- Würzburg train attack
- List of mass stabbings in Germany
