= 2024 Solingen stabbing =

2024 mass stabbing in Solingen, Germany

- Location: 51.17°N 07.08°E; Fronhof marketplace, Solingen, North Rhine-Westphalia, Germany
- Date: 23 August 2024; 21:37 (CEST)
- Target: Festival goers
- Attack type: Mass stabbing
- Weapon: Carving knife
- Deaths: 3
- Injuries: 8
- Perpetrator: Issa al Hassan
- Motive: Ideology of the Islamic State
- Verdict: Guilty; life sentence
- Convictions: Murder x3 Attempted murder x10 Membership of a terrorist organisation

On the evening of 23 August 2024, a mass stabbing took place in Solingen, North Rhine-Westphalia, Germany, in which three people were killed and eight were injured. Following the attack, a 24-hour manhunt ensued, which ended with police arresting the perpetrator, a 26-year-old Syrian refugee. In September 2025, the attacker, after having confessed to his crimes at the beginning of the trial, received a life sentence to be followed by preventive detention.

The public prosecutor accused the suspect of being motivated by "radical Islamist convictions". The attacker is also suspected of being a member of Islamic State, which claimed responsibility for the attack. His asylum application was rejected in 2023, and although he was ordered to be deported to Bulgaria—where he had previously applied for asylum—authorities were unable to locate him, during which time he remained in Germany.

The stabbing has intensified the migration debate in Germany, prompting some politicians to advocate for stricter border controls and a suspension of refugee admissions. German Chancellor Olaf Scholz characterised the attack as "terrorism against us all" and stressed the need for his government to expedite repatriation and deportation.

== Background ==
The attack occurred during an event called the Festival of Diversity (Festival der Vielfalt), a three-day event from 23 to 25 August celebrating Solingen's 650th anniversary. It had been billed as turning the city center Solingen-Mitte into a big "celebration mile" from the public squares the Neumarkt to the Mühlenplatz. The incident took place at the Fronhof, a central square and marketplace in the heart of the city, where three stages had been set up for live music performances.

Prior to the stabbing, there was a 10% annual rise in knife attacks in Germany, particularly in city centers and at railway stations. Interior minister Nancy Faeser earlier in August 2024 told public broadcaster ARD that more stringent restrictions were needed on knives in public places, with exceptions only for household knives in closed packaging that have just been bought.

== Attack ==
The attack occurred around 21:40 in front of the main stage during an ongoing performance by a local band. A man stabbed several people, with the majority suffering wounds to the neck. Three were killed and eight others were injured. During the subsequent panic, the attacker fled the area unnoticed and discarded the weapon, a kitchen knife 15 cm in length, in a nearby trash can, as well as his jacket and personal documents in an alley. DJ Topic, performing at the time of the attack, said he had been asked by security to continue his set to prevent mass panic.

=== Investigation and manhunt ===
North Rhine-Westphalia Police immediately considered the possibility of terrorism as a motive for the attack and believed they were dealing with a single attacker. An online forum was created on the NRW Police website the same night to collect digital images and video from witnesses. A statement by Düsseldorf public prosecutor's office the following day announced that the investigation was treating the stabbing as a terror attack. A major alert was issued, followed by a statewide manhunt. Armed officers were on site, having cordoned off large sections of the city, with barriers in place across various locations. According to the German daily tabloid Bild, heavily armed SEK units, totaling around 40 special vehicles from across North Rhine-Westphalia, were deployed to Solingen. Road junctions were blocked, and residents were advised to stay indoors and avoid the city center.

On 24 August, Islamic State (ISIS) released a statement through its Amaq News Agency outlet on the messaging app Telegram claiming responsibility. On 25 August, ISIS shared a one-minute video in social media, showing a masked man, who the group claimed to be the perpetrator, holding a knife and swearing an oath of loyalty to its leader. In the same video, the man professes that the attack was committed as a vengeance act for the killings of Muslims in Syria, Bosnia, Iraq, and Palestine with "support of Zionists". This was the first time that ISIS had claimed responsibility for a terrorist attack on German soil since the 2016 Berlin truck attack. As of 29 August 2024, North Rhine-Westphalia's interior minister Herbert Reul stated that the man could not certainly be identified as the actual perpetrator, nor could direct ISIS involvement be confirmed.

Due to security concerns, the remainder of the festival was canceled, as were coinciding celebrations in the neighbouring towns Hilden and Haan. A 15-year-old was arrested in connection with the case, with authorities stating he was seen speaking with the perpetrator moments before the attack. The teenager is not the primary suspect but is alleged to have known about the attack without reporting it to authorities.

Nearly 26 hours after the stabbing, and with help from intelligence supplied by Turkey, the police arrested a man who fit the description provided by victims. Officers had noticed him as his clothes were dirty and bloody. Police had addressed him right after noticing his behaviour and appearance as suspicious. According to officers, he had purposely approached them, making a throat-cutting gesture while pointing at himself. His whereabouts in the time between the stabbing and the arrest, and whether he had spoken to anybody and what he had done in that time remained unclear as of early September 2024.

== Victims ==
The three dead victims were identified as 67-year-old Stefan Schulz, 56-year-old Ines Wallusch, and 56-year-old Florian H., the former two locals to Solingen while H. was a regular commuter from Düsseldorf. The injured included the husband of Ines Wallusch and an Iranian national. One of the injured witnesses told police he recognised the assailant as a regular visitor of a local mosque. The eight injured were treated at Solingen Clinic. All four of the severely wounded were in stable condition by 26 August.

== Perpetrator ==
The attacker was identified as 26-year-old Issa al Hassan (Arabic: عيسى الْحَسَنِ). He was born in 1998 in Deir ez-Zor to a family of farmers. Al Hassan left school in the eighth grade and worked in agriculture. In 2015, at age 17, he moved to the outskirts of Al-Tabqah, which was under the control of the Islamic State (ISIS). He lived there for four years before moving to live with his brothers in Tell Abyad, which lies directly on the border to Turkey. He left Syria in November 2022, reportedly at the wish of his family to avoid potential entry into ISIS. According to his sister, Al Hassan was not religious of his Sunni faith and did not observe Ramadan. Via Turkey, he arrived in Bulgaria on 7 December 2022 and was registered as a refugee, but left his accommodation in Busmantsi without notice after a week. The same month, Al Hassan traveled to Bochum, Germany, and on 27 January 2023, he filed an asylum application in Bielefeld, in which he named several reasons for his immigration, including fears of conscription into the Syrian Arab Armed Forces, opposition to the Assad government's actions in the Rojava conflict and to financially support his family.

Al Hassan's application was denied in February 2023 since he was registered in Bulgaria and based on the Dublin Regulation, he was to be deported there to receive asylum status. From 18 to 24 April 2023 he was absent from his accommodation, a fact which the municipal immigration office in Bielefeld was not informed of; had it been informed, it could have required Al Hassan to stay in his room at night. The deportation order was not fulfilled as Al Hassan was not found at his assigned refugee housing in Paderborn when police arrived there in the early hours of 5 June 2023 to pick him up, although he had been seen at lunch in the housing on 5 June. If he had been required to stay in his room at night, the breach would have allowed authorities to extended the deadline for his return to Bulgaria. He subsequently reappeared at the Paderborn accommodation on 23 August 2023, but the staff did not inform authorities about the return. Because he was not known to be dangerous, authorities did not issue a warrant for his arrest after the abortive attempt at deportation. No second attempt at deportation was made. With the six-months deadline for the return having run out a few days before his August reappearance, Germany was now responsible for processing his asylum claim. He was granted subsidiary protection in late 2023 and was assigned accommodation in Solingen. The accommodation was located 300 meters from the later attack site and a search of the building showed that the knife used in the stabbing had been taken from the communal kitchen.

Al Hassan had not been identified by authorities as an Islamic extremist prior to the attack. Terrrorism researcher Guido Steinberg noted that Al Hassan, having grown up in the ISIS-dominated Raqqa Governorate, was certain to have at least interacted with ISIS through municipal authorities since his mid-teens. Al Hassan claimed his only contact at this time was when their offices denied him an identification card in 2014. In February 2024, apparently unbeknownst to the security staff at his accommodation and acquaintances, he created a Telegram group in which he shared videos related to the Islamic State. The Gaza war appeared to have radicalized him.

After Al Hassan's arrest, the Public Prosecutor General took over the investigation on suspicion of a terrorist offence or politically motivated crime. On 25 August, Al Hassan was remanded in pre-trial custody on suspicion of murder and membership of ISIS, among other charges. Initially named only as Issa al H. due to German privacy laws, his full name became public within hours and was continually published in the press. On the same day, prosecutors stated that he "shared the radical ideology of the Islamic State extremist group" and the motive for the attack was his "radical Islamist convictions". A team of 50 investigators supported by the Federal Criminal Police Office was working on the case as of early September 2024.

Al Hassan was formally charged with murder, attempted murder and membership in an overseas terrorist organization on 27 February 2025. At his trial he admitted the killings. In September 2025, Al Hassan received a life sentence, including for murder, to be followed by preventive detention. Al Hassan's legal team filed for revision in order to remove preventive detention from the ruling.

== Reactions ==
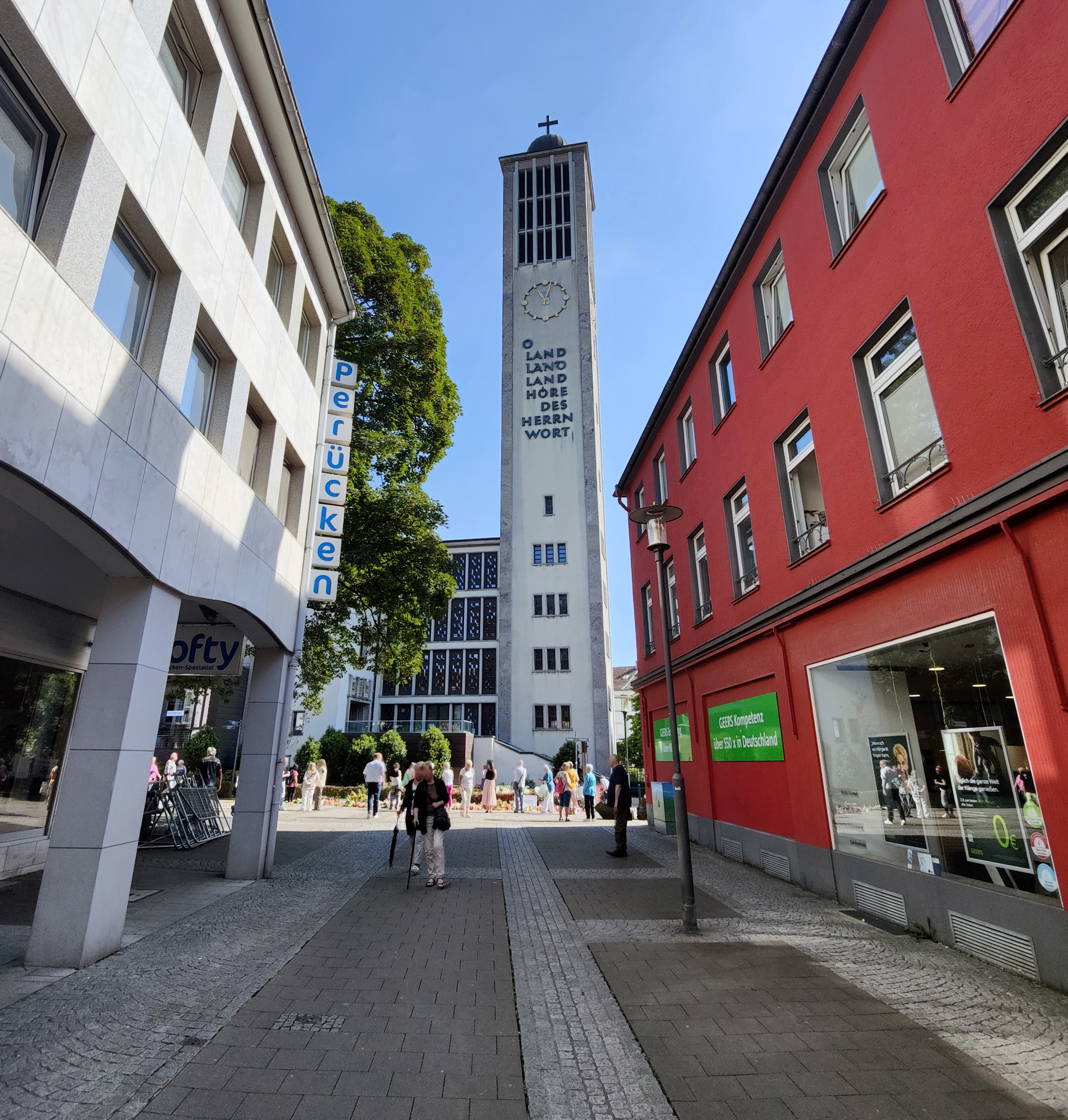
View from Solingen's Küstergasse to the beginning of Fronhof, where the Chancellor, Minister-President and others laid flowers on 26 August

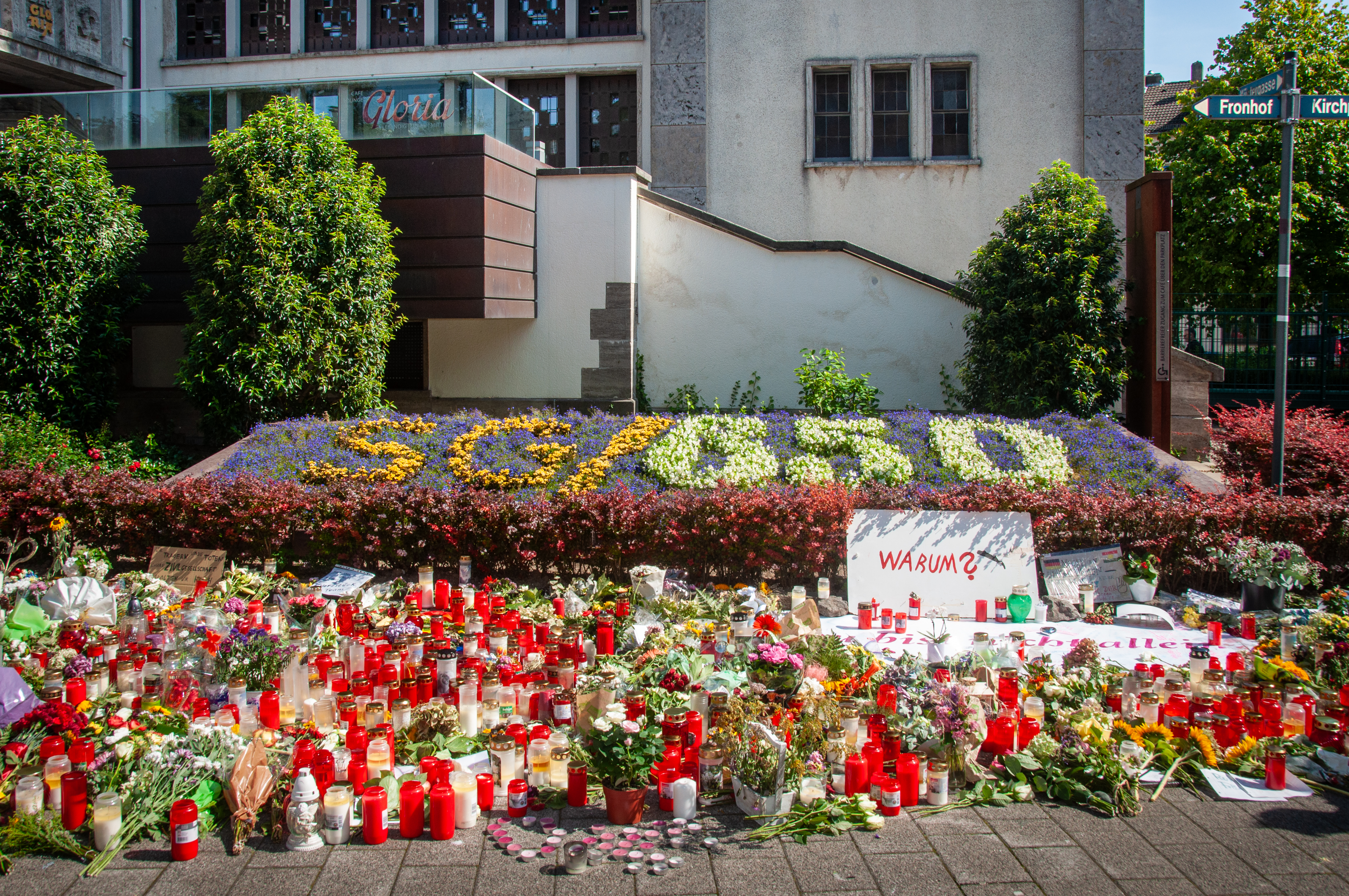
A memorial for the victims

Minister of the Interior of North Rhine-Westphalia Herbert Reul, who traveled to Solingen on the night of the attack, warned against speculation about the perpetrator, saying that it was as yet impossible to say anything about him or his motives. Reul, Federal Minister of the Interior Nancy Faeser and North Rhine-Westphalia minister president Hendrik Wüst visited the crime scene on 24 August.

Solingen's mayor, Tim Kurzbach, wrote a post about the attack on the city's Facebook page, saying that "This evening, we are all in shock, horror and great sadness in Solingen. We all wanted to celebrate our city's anniversary together and now we have to mourn the dead and injured." He also thanked all emergency services that responded to the attack.

After the attack, the political debate about concrete consequences first centred around making the German weapons law more stringent. Vice-chancellor Robert Habeck of the Greens expressed support for such a measure, while saying it was uncertain if this could have prevented the attack. The debate shifted after it transpired that the suspect is a rejected asylum seeker. In an email to chancellor Olaf Scholz of the SPD seen by media, Friedrich Merz, leader of the CDU/CSU, the largest opposition party, asked for radical changes in migration policy. SPD chief Lars Klingbeil asked for a slate of measures against Islamic extremism. Fellow SPD chief Saskia Esken said in early September that lessons should be drawn from the attack, after previous statements by her to the extent that there was nothing much to learn from it, as the alleged perpetrator had not been known to police, had widely been criticized. Esken expressed preference for better enforcement of existing asylum legislation over tightening it. She also called for requiring social media companies to control content. The far-right party Alternative for Germany blamed not only the ruling coalition but also the CDU/CSU opposition for alleged shortcomings on security, linking it with immigration even before the identity of the assailant was released.

On 26 August, chancellor Olaf Scholz described the attack as "terrorism, terrorism against us all" during a visit to Solingen. He emphasised the need for his government to ensure that individuals who should not be in Germany are repatriated and deported, with a focus on accelerating the process if needed. He also committed to promptly strengthening regulations on weapon ownership.

On 29 August, the German government proposed a toughening of weapons laws and asylum rules. Two draft laws were introduced by the government on 12 September, which covered extending knife prohibitions, reducing state support to certain refugees, and extending powers of authorities in fighting terrorism.

On 30 August, Germany deported 28 Afghan nationals to Afghanistan after two months of negotiations with Qatar as a mediator. All individuals were males and convicted criminals, and each received €1,000.

Influenced by the stabbing, the state of Thuringia in late August granted its district governments the right to declare no-weapons zones in certain public places, and Bavaria declared in early September its intention to do the same. Similar measures had already been taken in other German states years before the stabbing.

Criminologist Dirk Baier of the Zurich University of Applied Sciences warned that stricter laws were unlikely to root out knife assaults, saying that they were ineffective against young perpetrators and that there had to be enough checking personnel in the proposed weapons-ban zones. He called the stabbings a "social problem" that had to be addressed with social measures. When interviewed by the press service of the Evangelical Church in Germany, social psychologist Andreas Zick of Bielefeld University called for a thorough analysis of the terror, a deepened analysis of potential perpetrators, a careful assessment of options for the possibility of implementation from a legal viewpoint – something that he saw as having been neglected by parties in the middle of the political spectrum in the past –, and most of all, care for the victims and their relatives. The Gaza war had, according to Zick, already increased the risk of violence in Germany and other European countries. He said that the Solingen attack would yield information on where the violence came from and which old and new ideologies played a role in this.

The government measures to reduce support for rejected asylum seekers as announced on 29 August, were watered down by SPD and Green party MPs who stated that they wanted to prevent rejected asylum seekers from becoming homeless and impoverished. After the new regulation from mid October, support can now only be stopped if there are no obstacles blocking rejected asylum seekers from leaving. After a meeting of the Bundestag's interior ministry committee, where the changes were discussed, opposition members called the measures "pointless" while a police union representative called them a "mockery" of the victims of Solingen.

Josefine Paul, Minister for Children, Youth, Family, Equality, Refugees and Integration in NRW since 2022, declared on 27 January 2026 she would give up the office. Pressure on her had been rising in the days before her decision, after an SMS surfaced she allegedly sent a day after the stabbing, in which she asked her staff details about Issa al Hassan. At the same time, she made no public statements regarding the attack for several days, while being on a working visit to France. The opposition had complained that the SMS in question had not been made available for the committee of inquiry beforehand.

== See also ==
- 2024 Munich shooting
- 2024 Mannheim stabbing
- 2024 Solingen arson attack
- List of mass stabbing incidents (2020–present)
- List of mass stabbings in Germany
- Stabbing as a terrorist tactic
