= 2024 Mannheim stabbing =

Mass stabbing in Mannheim, Germany

- Location: 49.4898°N 8.4672°E; Mannheim, Germany
- Date: 31 May 2024; 2 years ago 11:34 a.m. (CEST; UTC+02:00)
- Target: Michael Stürzenberger
- Attack type: Mass stabbing
- Weapons: Python hunting knife Switchblade (unused); Slingshot (unused)
- Deaths: 1 (police officer)
- Injuries: 6 (including the perpetrator)
- Victim: Rouven Laur
- Perpetrator: Sulaiman Ataee
- Verdict: Guilty
- Convictions: Murder; Attempted murder x4 Dangerous bodily harm x1
- Judge: Herbert Anderer

On 31 May 2024 at 11:34 a.m., a mass stabbing took place at a rally hosted by the counter-jihad and Islam critic group, Citizens' Movement Pax Europa (BPE) in the market square in Mannheim, Baden-Württemberg, Germany. Six people were injured, including activist Michael Stürzenberger, the main speaker at the rally, who was the intended target of the attack. Police officer Rouven Laur, assigned as security for the event, died from stab wounds to the neck two days later. The attack was stopped when the attacker, 25-year-old Afghan national Sulaiman Ataee, was shot and injured by another police officer.

The investigation determined that the stabbing was carried out with Islamist motives, which were affirmed by the perpetrator. Ataee issued a confession in court that he carried out the attack to kill critics of Islam and "supposed infidels". On 16 September 2025, Ataee was convicted of murder and dangerous bodily harm, and sentenced to life imprisonment.

== Stabbing ==
The BPE rally was held in Mannheim's market square where Michael Stürzenberger was supposed to give a speech. A third party happened to be livestreaming on YouTube at the time. Footage from the event showed the suspect watching the scene for around 15 minutes.

The incident started at around 11:34 am, while Stürzenberger prepared for the event. Ataee took out a knife from a waist bag and ran towards Stürzenberger when he was on his own. Someone shouted a warning to alert Stürzenberger, with two BPE supporters, Konrad Schneider from Ortenau and Jony L., an Iraqi Aramean, running over to fend off the attack. Schneider was stabbed numerous times in the leg.

Ataee went after Stürzenberger again, wrestling him to the ground and stabbing him several times. At least four people attempted to pull Ataee away, many of whom yelled "(put) the knife away!". Jony L. grabbed Ataee's right hand which was holding the knife. Another BPE volunteer, Paul Z., was stabbed in the upper arm while visitor Moritz H. was stabbed in the knee. A passerby, Torsten K., joined the effort and apparently confusing Jony L. for Ataee, Torsten K. began repeatedly hitting Jony L. from behind. The action caused Jony L. to lose his grip, causing Ataee to break free and stab Jony L. three times in the back.

At this point, officers of a police squad, deployed for event security, reached the scene. The squad leader, 29-year-old Rouven Laur, threw the mistaken passerby, Torsten K., to the ground. Laur then turned away from Ataee and pinned down K. by kneeling on him, allowing Ataee to run around Laur and stab him in the neck. Laur momentarily collapsed and another police officer then non-fatally shot Ataee. The attack occurred within around 25 seconds.

== Victims ==
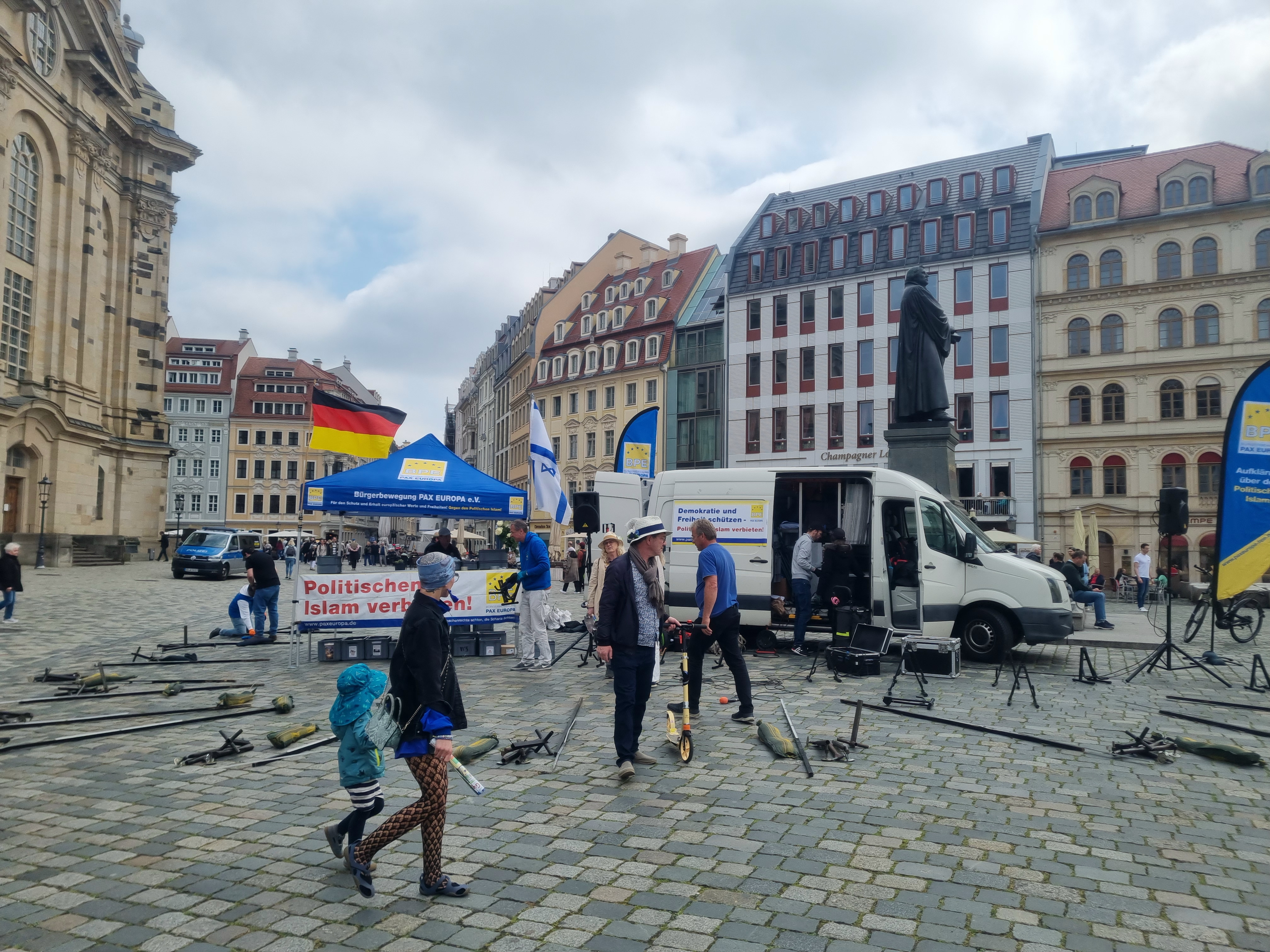
Michael Stürzenberger below the flag of Israel, at the beginning an earlier BPE rally held in Dresden

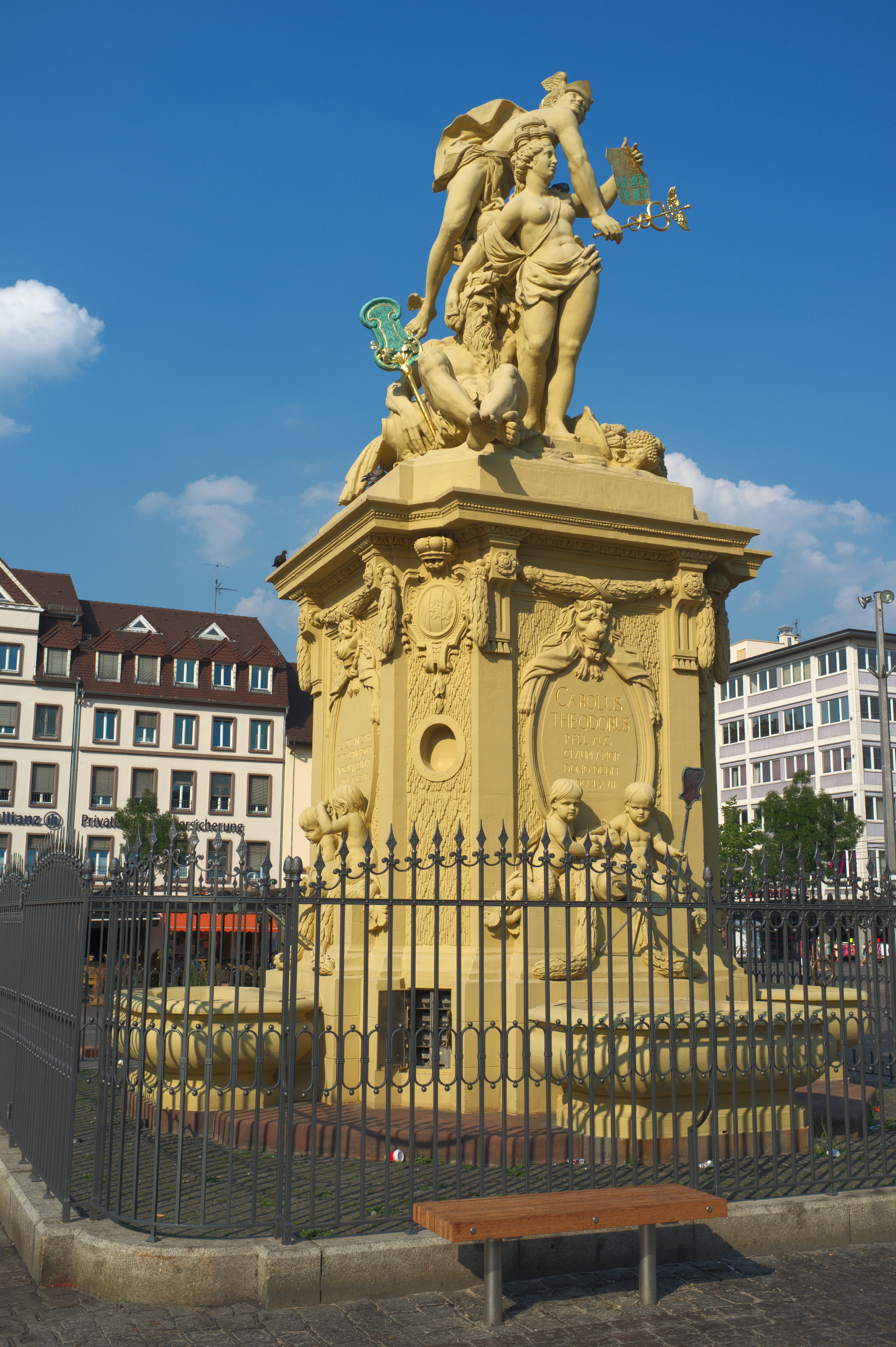
The Marktplatz square well in Mannheim, the site of the attack

According to Der Spiegel, the authorities assumed a total of seven people were injured, including the attacker and the police officer. The nationalities and ages of all five injured civilians were shared by police in a press report; three were German citizens, one was a German Kazakh, and one was an Iraqi.

Laur remained conscious and was placed in an induced coma and underwent emergency surgery, but succumbed to his injuries two days after the stabbing. Stürzenberger was stabbed in the face, chest, and thigh and underwent emergency surgery. On 1 June 2024, Stürzenberger posted on his Telegram page that the chest stab wound narrowly missed his lungs while the thigh stab wound caused significant blood loss due to striking veins.

== Perpetrator ==
Twenty-five-year-old Afghan refugee Sulaiman Ataee (Dari: سلیمان عطایی) was arrested at the scene. He was born in Herat in 1999, as one of five children to a Tajik family. Ataee attended school until the sixth grade and practised taekwondo since childhood. In 2011, Ataee and his older brother were brought to the Afghanistan–Iran border by their father, who paid the equivalent of €20,000 to have his sons smuggled to Europe, with the initial destination of Sweden. After spending several months in Iran, the brothers were trafficked over Turkey, Greece, Italy, and France, arriving in Germany in March 2013 as unaccompanied minors after nearly two years.

Ataee applied for asylum in Frankfurt and was placed in a youth residential group in Bensheim, joining a taekwondo club and winning a regional championship in Rhineland-Palatinate the same year. His asylum application was denied in 2014, but he could not be deported due to being underage. He graduated from Hauptschule in 2017, after which he worked as an assistant worker and warehouse clerk in the paper and packaging industry as well as a bartender for a tapas restaurant. He lived in Heppenheim at the time of the attack, around 30 km from Mannheim. Ataee reportedly had a valid residence permit, married in 2019, and had two children.

=== Investigation ===
Following the attack, Ataee had emergency surgery and was placed in an induced coma at Theresien Hospital for approximately two weeks. On 17 June, he was transferred into police custody, but as of 4 July, he was not deemed capable of being interrogated. The Baden-Württemberg State Office of Criminal Investigation announced that an arrest warrant was issued against Ataee for attempted murder, and his apartment was searched.

Besides the hunting knife used in the attack, a search of Ataee's person showed that he carried a switchblade and a slingshot. He had ordered all items online a few days earlier. A train ticket was found showing that he came by S-Bahn, which he boarded at 9:59 earlier that day. Surveillance footage analysed by police showed a figure dressed in similar clothing departing a train in Mannheim Hauptbahnhof at 11:04 and arriving at the Marktplatz at 11:19.

German authorities had not flagged him as an extremist prior to the attack. According to Der Spiegel, investigators believe Islamist motives to be possible. Later investigations confirmed that the perpetrator had begun showing interest in the Taliban following the 2021 Taliban takeover and forged contacts with "radical agitators and pseudo-Islamic scholars" via Telegram. He began voicing sympathies for the Islamic State, but no evidence was found that he established direct contact or received orders from IS. Ataee himself stated that he was further radicalised after viewing videos depicting the killing of Palestinian civilians during the Gaza war. He planned to be killed during the attack to "die a martyr's death".

=== Trial ===
On 4 July 2024, a federal court charged Ataee with murder, attempted murder and dangerous bodily harm. At least three of the injured victims were co-plaintiffs in the trial. The charges were affirmed on 25 October 2024. The prosecution cited the reasons for the murder charge, which automatically carries a life sentence on conviction, as malice aforethought and "base motives" of the defendant after German law. The prosecution found insufficient evidence to add a charge of membership in a terrorist organisation, but acknowledged Ataee's contact with unaffiliated Islamic extremists. His trial began on 13 February 2025 at Oberlandesgericht Stuttgart and was scheduled to take place over fifty court dates for autumn 2025, though the court proceedings ultimately lasted 35 days.

On the second court date on 12 February 2025, Ataee admitted guilt and voiced regret for his actions, telling the court that he was willing to make a full confession, which occurred during the third court appearance on 24 March. The co-plaintiffs, who included the family of Rouven Laur, spoke in favour of a life sentence and preventive detention, with Julia Mende, the lawyer of the Laur family, calling Ataee's confession "lip service".

On 16 September, Ataee was found guilty of all charges and sentenced to life in prison with the determination of the particular gravity of guilt, which makes a release on parole more difficult. During his final statement before the verdict, Ataee repeated his apology to the surviving victims and the parents of Rouven Laur, saying he "wished to have never committed this crazy act". The sentence was not yet final, but the defence stated that they would not file for revision.

== Aftermath ==
The event took place about a week before the 9 June 2024 European Parliament election, held in Germany in connection with some regional and local elections. Two days after the attack, a public statement released by the Mannheim Police Department and State Criminal Police Office of Baden-Württemberg mourned the death of the police officer who gave his life trying to control the situation and stop the violence.

A public vigil was set up in the market square where the stabbing took place. At the same time, Young Alternative members set up an anti-immigration protest at the market square, which was met by counter-protesters that included members of Antifa organizations.

On 3 June, a memorial service was held in Mannheim for the murdered police officer attended by around 8,000 people, featuring speeches from the dean of the Jesuit Church, Karl Jung, and imam of Yavuz Sultan Selim Mosque Mustafa Aydinli. In the meantime, a TikTok user known by the pseudonym "Imam Meti" who called for the murder of "all ex-Muslims and every critic of Islam" following the attack, was later identified as the 35-year-old Pristina-born Kosovar Muhamed R., according to a report by the Federal Criminal Police Office (BKA) and the Federal Office for the Protection of the Constitution.

On 5 June, local AfD council candidate politician Heinrich Koch was hospitalized with non-serious injuries after a stabbing in Mannheim.

In the Abgeordnetenhaus of Berlin session of 6 June, when Berlin senator Iris Spranger mentioned (with double meaning in German) "... the terrible death in/of Mannheim ...", Alliance 90/The Greens member Tuba Bozkurt joked "Mannheim is dead?", causing laughter among other members, according to the protocol. Party leader Omid Nouripour and Bozkurt herself apologized.

On 7 June, one week after the attack, the Baden-Württemberg state chapter of the Alternative for Germany (AfD) wanted to organize a memorial rally on the site of the attack. Despite several other events having been held there since the attack, this was denied by the city, which claimed that from 4 until 16 June, only individual mourning was allowed there, as declared on a sign. After an appeal, a higher court upheld the ban. The AfD had to move to a different square, Paradeplatz.

== Reactions ==
German chancellor Olaf Scholz said on X that the footage was "terrible", that such acts of violence were "absolutely unacceptable", and that "[t]he perpetrator must be severely punished". He later stated that action was needed against extremist political violence from those who tried to restrict the democratic space for discussion, regardless of their political or religious orientation.

Federal Interior Minister Nancy Faeser said that it was up to investigators to determine a motive, adding that "if the investigation shows an Islamist motive, that would be another confirmation of the great danger from Islamist acts of violence that we have warned of."

North Rhine-Westphalia's Interior Minister Herbert Reul stated that stronger measures for controlling the possession and violent use of knives with greater focus on security policy, stronger punishments, and education about their dangers were required.

Green Party politician Konstantin von Notz and FDP vice-chairman Konstantin Kuhle both condemned anyone who glorified the act of violence, with the latter stating that anyone who publicly celebrated the stabbing should face immediate and severe criminal proceedings, and that Muslim associations needed to make clear statements denouncing the use and glorification of violence to prevent future attacks.

On 30 August 2024, a deportation flight with 28 Afghans, all male criminals, left Berlin for Afghanistan, the first such flight since the Taliban had taken power in the country in 2021. A German government spokesperson said the same day that "intensive efforts" had been made since the Mannheim stabbing in order to deport migrants who have committed serious crimes back to Afghanistan and Syria. Earlier after the stabbing, chancellor Scholz had announced that deportations to those two countries would be possible again in the case of the most dangerous criminals and terror suspects.

On 6 April 2025, a report by ZDF alleged that Russian online engines contained instances of searches to specific attacks in Germany several days before they occurred. The report claimed that four days prior to the Mannheim stabbing, key phrases such as "terror attack in Mannheim", "terror attack in Germany", "Michael Stürzenberger terror attack", and "Michael Stürzenberger stabbed to death", along with Sulaiman Ataee's name, were searched in Russia. ZDF posited that the stabbing was planned with Russian involvement to influence the European Parliament election that occurred a week after, as well as later attacks like the car-ramming attacks of Magdeburg, Munich, and Mannheim in the following months, ahead of the German federal election. The judge presiding over Ataee's trial ordered federal and Baden-Württemberg Police to investigate the defendant's history for possible contacts into Russia. The Federal Intelligence Service (BND), which previously held investigations into covert attacks on German infrastructure by Russia, has voiced doubts about the ZDF report claim, although the agency does not rule out other operations. During the verdict in the perpetrator's trial, Oberlandesgericht Stuttgart stated that its senate saw "no relevance" in the reports in relation to its prosecution of Ataee.

== See also ==
- Stabbing of Salman Rushdie
- 2023 Brokstedt stabbing
- 2024 Wakeley church stabbing
- 2024 Solingen stabbing
- 2024 Munich shooting
- 2025 Mannheim car attack
- Berlin Holocaust memorial stabbing
