= 2025 Aschaffenburg stabbing attack =

Mass stabbing in Bavaria, Germany

2025 Aschaffenburg stabbing
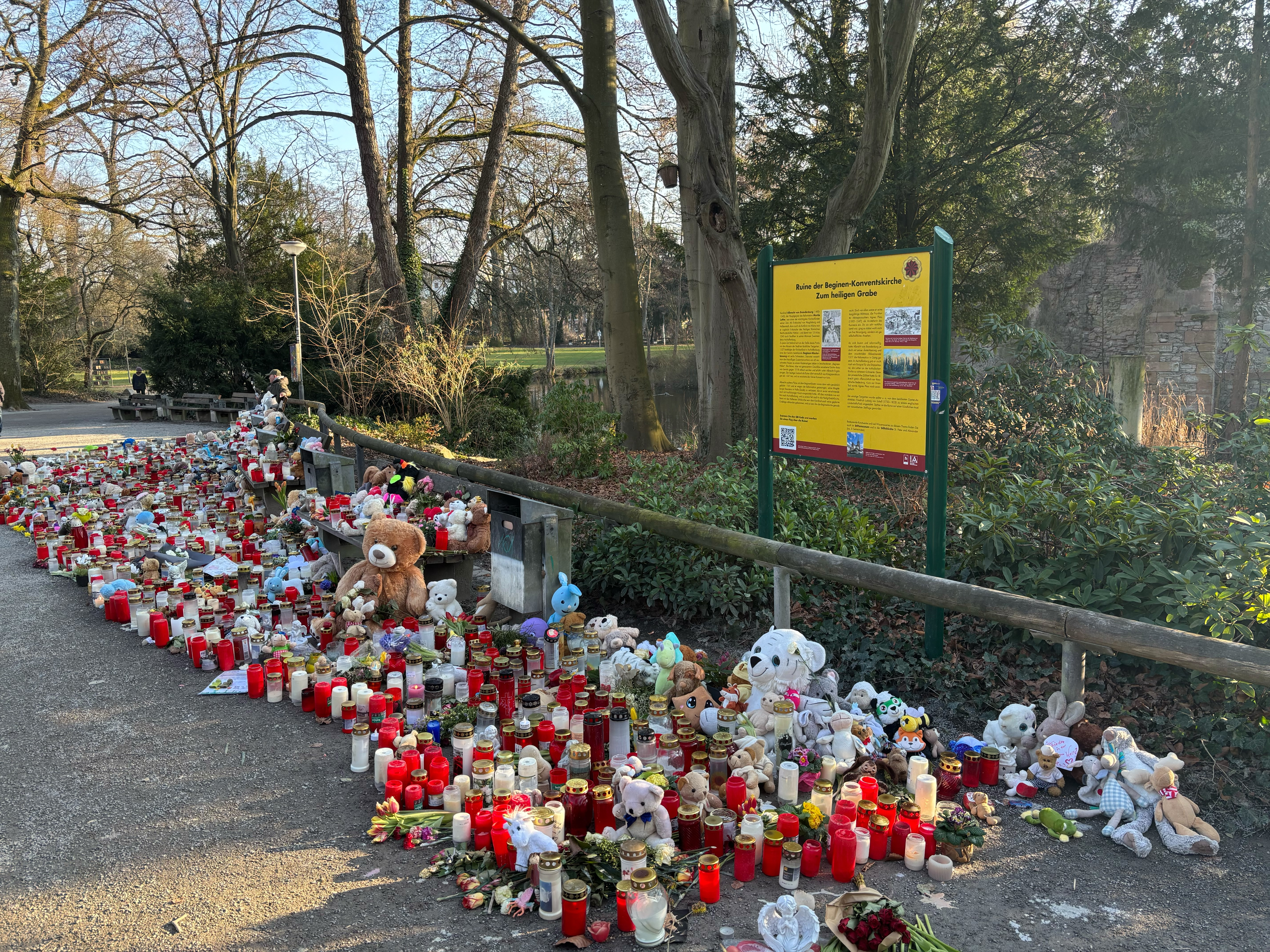
- A memorial at the scene
- Location: 49°58′31.879″N 9°9′7.211″E; Schöntal Park, Aschaffenburg, Bavaria, Germany
- Date: 22 January 2025; 11:45 a.m. (CET)
- Target: Children
- Attack type: Mass stabbing, child murder
- Weapon: Kitchen knife
- Deaths: 2
- Injuries: 3
- Perpetrator: Enamullah Omarzai
- Charges: Murder; Attempted murder Manslaughter; Attempted manslaughter Assault
- Verdict: Not criminally responsible
- Judge: Karsten Krebs

On 22 January 2025, a mass stabbing took place at a park in Aschaffenburg, Bavaria, Germany. 28-year-old Afghan asylum seeker Enamullah Omarzai killed two people and wounded three.

Omarzai was wanted after failing to serve a prison term and had been obligated to leave the country since December 2024. Omarzai was previously diagnosed with schizophrenia and in October 2025, Aschaffenburg court ordered for indefinite involuntary commitment.

The stabbing, along with the car-ramming attack in Munich the following month, contributed significantly to the renewed discussion about immigration policy, particularly deportation of denied asylum seekers, ahead of Germany's snap election in February. The new government under Chancellor Friedrich Merz increased deportations of criminal asylum seekers in part due to the attack. ZDF described the stabbing as a "key moment" in the pre-election period.

== Attack ==
The perpetrator entered the Schöntal Park at around 11:30 local time. Inside the park, he followed a kindergarten group, consisting of two female teachers and five children, for fifteen minutes. At 11:45, the perpetrator allegedly ran past the teachers to attack two toddlers who sat inside a toy wagon, pulling off the hat and scarf of a two-year-old boy before stabbing him and a two-year-old girl. The boy, a German citizen of Moroccan descent, died after suffering seven stab wounds while the girl, born in Syria, survived with critical injuries.

A 59-year-old teacher tried to save the children, but she was pushed by the knifeman, breaking her hand. Two male passersby, both German nationals, pulled the perpetrator away from the children, leading to a prolonged struggle during which the teachers and the remaining children escaped the scene. The attacker stabbed both men in the back and flank, killing a 41-year-old man and injuring a 72-year-old man.

Other passersby, three of whom were armed with pitchforks, chased after the attacker as he fled. Up to fifty people who saw the attacker participated in the search, with two calling the police mid-pursuit. He was then arrested by police two kilometres from the crime scene, outside a train tunnel of the Main Valley Railway near Wilhelm-Hoegner-Anlage, twelve minutes later.

== Perpetrator ==
The suspect was identified as Enamullah Omarzai (Pashto: إنعام الله عمرزی), born in 1997 in Kunduz, Afghanistan. He arrived in Bulgaria from Turkey in early 2022 and spent some time in France before illegally moving to Germany in November 2022. Four months later he requested the right of asylum. It was however refused in June 2023, with the Federal Office for Migration and Refugees ordering a repatriation to Bulgaria.

At the time of the stabbing, Omarzai had 18 criminal proceedings against him. His criminal record in Germany consisted of serious bodily harm, assault, and falsifying a public transport ticket. For his first offence in March 2023, a physical fight at a refugee centre in Schweinfurt, he was sentenced to a fine of €800, which he ultimately did not pay.

In January 2024, Omarzai visited a psychiatrist after voicing suicidal thoughts. On 13 May 2024, Omarzai had come to a precinct of the Federal Police in Aschaffenburg, seeking medical aid after ingesting "Diamonds". After an ambulance was called, he displayed further erratic behaviour by first attempting to leave before throwing a punch at a nearby policewoman. During a struggle with three officers, Omarzai undid the safety of an officer's sidearm and attempted to grab a baton before being restrained with handcuffs and cable binders. He was treated for a shoulder injury and determined to have been under the influence of cannabis. Psychiatric staff noted that Omarzai constantly switched languages mid-sentence and fluctuated between moods, asking doctors to book him a flight back to Afghanistan the next day. Omarzai was diagnosed with adjustment disorder and a potential polymorphic psychotic disorder with symptoms of schizophrenia before being released the same day. This decision was criticised, as Omarzai had shown clear signs of mental illness and should have been held on account of endangerment to others since he had attempted to grab a police officer's gun. On 6 June 2024, Omarzai stripped naked in front of police at Aschaffenburg Hauptbahnhof and climbed into a salt bin, where he hit his head and fell unconscious.

While at refugee accommodations in Alzenau and Werneck, Omarzai was noted for his violent disposition and arrested three times in January and August 2024 for assaulting other refugees. The latter incident, in which Omarzai had also damaged cars and kicked a paramedic in the face while drunk, again led to a psychiatric stay, from which he was released after several hours. On 2 December 2024, Omarzai was sentenced to 40 days imprisonment for failing to pay a fine, but did not show up to prison on 23 December. Omarzai had volunteered to return to Afghanistan after his sentence, for which federal authorities had labelled him obligated to leave the country.

After his conviction, Omarzai was also assigned to mental health counselling, which diagnosed him with schizophrenia and prescribed medication. However, Omarzai showed poor progress and maintained concurrent addictions to alcohol and cannabis. He had stopped taking his medication altogether a few days before the attack. Several doctor's reports had described Omarzai as usually calm and polite, yet occasionally confused and irritable, being prone to impulsive action. A final report from early January 2025 stated there were no hints indicating that Omarzai posed a danger to himself or others.

== Investigation ==
Authorities stated that the stabbings were not carried out for a political or religious motive. Omarzai had been previously recorded for mental illness and was temporarily detained at a psychiatric center after the killings.

In late February 2025 the prosecutor's office informed about an evaluation, which concluded that the attacker may not be responsible for his action due to a psychiatric disease. Doctors suspected that the defendant may be affected by psychosis or schizophrenia, having previously shown to experience persecutory delusions and possibly hallucinations. According to statements made by Omarzai, he heard voices of "a devil" and "agents" in his head, who commanded him to kill children on the day of the attack. On 11 June 2025, the prosecutor's office stated that it had concluded its investigation, and had requested the regional court to permanently commit the suspect to a psychiatric hospital.

On 30 October 2025, after a six-day trial, Landgericht Aschaffenburg imposed involuntary commitment to a psychiatric institution. The decision had been made in agreement with the prosecution and the defence, as well as in correspondence with surviving victims, who were co-plaintiffs in the trial. Presiding judge Karsten Krebs emphasised that Omarzai was unlikely to be released and that he would be held in a "prison-like environment". An assessor had made a poor prognosis for Omarzai due to belated treatment, prior substance addictions, and social isolation. Deportation was not considered viable, as authorities believed Omarzai would likely return to Germany and pose a substantial risk to the public.

== Aftermath ==
On 23 January, a silent vigil attended by 3,000 people was held outside of Schöntal Park. On 24 January, a memorial service for the murdered boy was held at a mosque in Frankfurt-Gallus, as the mosque frequented by the boy's family was too small. Around 1,000 attendants came, including Frankfurt Mayor Mike Josef. The boy's remains were buried in his ancestral home in Ait-Oubarkane, Morocco, with transport costs paid for by the Moroccan government. The service was preceded by a political rally in Aschaffenburg, headed by Thuringia AfD leader Björn Höcke and around seventy supporters. Höcke's speech, meant to commemorate the victims, was criticised as he incorrectly claimed that the murdered child was female and spent a significant portion of the speech talking about his anti-immigrant views, pausing several times while talking, apparently expecting applause from onlookers. The city of Aschaffenburg and criminologists subsequently urged right-wingers to not instrumentalise the attack for political purposes.

On 26 January, a public memorial service was held at Aschaffenburg's Stiftskirche, attended by a few thousand people, including Minister of the Interior Nancy Faeser and Bavarian Minister-President Markus Söder. An anti-immigration protest was held outside the church, alongside a counter-protest, both numbering a few hundred attendants.

On 5 April 2025, 30-year-old Somali national Ahmed Mohamed Odowaa, who had intervened when the two passersby were attacked and was one of three men who had chased down the perpetrator, was slated for deportation to Italy per the Dublin Regulation. This had been planned since October 2024, but due to Odowaa's role as a witness in the murders, the deportation had been delayed. The order caused outrage online, as Odowaa previously had received praise for his actions by Minister-President Söder and awarded a Christopherus Medal. Within the day, a total of 45,000 signatures were gathered to protest the deportation, and on 7 April, Odowaa received an extended toleration status and approval for his requested work permit. On 22 May 2025, Odowaa wrote a letter published through Main-Echo newspaper, thanking the public for their support. In the writings, Odowaa admitted that his pursuit of the perpetrator was motivated by self-preservation and that he struggled with anxiety and panic attacks since.

In early December 2025, it was reported that Odowaa was again required to leave Germany by the Federal Office for Migration and Refugees (BAMF) for continued unemployment, noting that the work permit had been used once, but that no job was taken up by him. Unterfranken authorities recommended a voluntary return, with a deadline for 1 January 2026. The Bavarian Ministry of the Interior also disclosed Odowaa's criminal history before he was publicly honored, consisting of two monetary fines for riding public transport without a ticket and propagation of pornographic contents, as well as an open case for trespassing at an immigration office. Odowaa subsequently left his accommodations in Würzburg on 11 December and left the country for France. He met with Die Zeit reporters on 24 December in Paris, where he was living homeless. According to Odowaa, he had feared that he would be deported to Somalia rather than Italy and was planning to return to Rome by himself. In regards to the information published by Bavarian authorities, Odowaa pointed out that the work permit was only valid for a specific warehouse job, which rejected him as all positions were already taken and claimed that other job applications in both Aschaffenburg and Würzburg were unsuccessful. Die Zeit and Main-Echo found merit to the latter statements based on available documents from immigration authorities. Odowaa attributed most of the issues to a language barrier and stated that he had only begun receiving German lessons in summer 2025, with further appointments being pushed back from December 2025 to March 2026. In January 2026, German police filed an arrest warrant for Odowaa for failure to report to BAMF to enforce the obligation to leave the country. If detained in Germany, he is to be placed in remand awaiting deportation.

In August 2025, a 29-year-old policeman who had previously arrested Omarzai for an assault was charged with obstruction of justice. The prosecution alleged that he had failed his duties as the leading officer by not initiating criminal proceedings against Omarzai, who had been detained for injuring his girlfriend with a knife in August 2024. The officer's defence partially attributed his decision to the girlfriend's intoxication and a language barrier, also noting that by the next day, the woman had declined to press charges against Omarzai out of forgiveness. On 28 October 2025, the officer was sentenced to five months imprisonment, suspended to a three-year probation, as well as a €3,000 fine to be paid to a charity for victims of crimes.

On the first anniversary of the stabbing in 2026, the city of Aschaffenburg announced that a memorial place was planned to be built within Schöntal Park.

== See also ==
- 2024 Solingen stabbing
- 2024 Mannheim stabbing
- 2023 Brokstedt train stabbing
- List of mass stabbing incidents (2020–present)
- List of mass stabbings in Germany
