= 2023 Brokstedt train stabbing =

2023 double murder in Germany

Brokstedt train stabbing
- Location: 53.9898°N 9.8233°E; Brokstedt, Schleswig-Holstein, Germany
- Date: 25 January 2023; 14:55 (CET)
- Attack type: Mass stabbing
- Weapon: Kitchen knife
- Deaths: 2
- Injuries: 6 (including the perpetrator)
- Perpetrator: Ibrahim A.
- Motive: Anger and frustration at his personal situation
- Verdict: Guilty
- Convictions: Two counts of murder, four counts of attempted murder
- Judge: Johann Lohmann

On 25 January 2023, a mass stabbing occurred on a Regionalbahn train at the railway station of Brokstedt, Schleswig-Holstein, Germany. Two persons were killed, while eight others were injured.

The perpetrator had arrived in Germany in 2014 and was granted subsidiary protection in 2016, even though he had been known to police. The public prosecutor saw the motive for the crime as anger and frustration with his personal situation. In February 2023, "considerable shortcomings in the communication and administration of the authorities involved in immigration" were found.

In April 2024, the perpetrator Ibrahim A. received a life sentence.

== Attack ==
The RB train RE 70 number 11223 was a passenger train which departed from Kiel with the destination of Hamburg. At the time of the attack, the train carried about 70 passengers.

Shortly before the train was about to pull into Brokstedt train station at 14:54, passengers noticed the perpetrator taking off his jacket and doing stretching exercises, before he went to stand in a doorway, actively blocking others from exiting. When the train came to a halt, the perpetrator began indiscriminately stabbing fellow passengers with a knife he had hidden in a sports bag. The first emergency calls came in at 14:56.

As the attack happened immediately before a scheduled stop, the train's doors were automatically opened to the platform, where around 50 people were present. The perpetrator and an injured woman exited the cart, with the former reentering the train through another entrance. Inside, the perpetrator attacked 21-year-old Felix Gerike, who had boarded the train in search of a first aid kit, leading to a struggle. Gerike was stabbed and slashed ten times and bitten on the nose before he managed to restrain his attacker by the wrists. Other bystanders grabbed the perpetrator from behind and were able to disarm him before the perpetrator fled the train.

By the time Federal Police arrived at around 15:05, several commuters had fixated the perpetrator to the ground on the train platform. The station was shut down to facilitate the ongoing emergency response efforts. The perpetrator was arrested at 15:16 and taken to hospital for light injuries.

== Victims ==
Two people were killed and five were injured, three critically and two with life-threatening wounds. The deceased victims were identified as a romantic couple, 17-year-old Ann-Marie Kyrath and 19-year-old Danny Preuß, both from Neumünster. Kyrath was stabbed 27 times while Preuß was stabbed 12 times, dying after a single stab wound to the heart while attempting to shield his girlfriend. Three of those stabbed were passengers on the train while two had boarded after the attack began. Three of the injured had to be put into an artificial coma after the attack. One of the severely injured, a 54-year-old woman who had previously been diagnosed with chronic depression, died by suicide four months after the stabbing.

== Perpetrator ==
The perpetrator was 33-year-old Ibrahim A., a stateless refugee originally from the Palestinian territories. He was born in 1989 as one of seven children in the Gaza Strip, where he worked as a fisherman and construction worker. Following the deaths of his parents in 2010 and 2012, Ibrahim A. left Gaza, claiming Hamas had threatened his life since he did not closely observe his Muslim faith. Hamas had previously killed one of his uncles and also tortured A. and other relatives with burns and cuts.

Via Turkey and Belgium, he arrived in Germany on 24 December 2014 and applied for asylum on 22 January 2015 in North Rhine-Westphalia, citing persecution by Hamas. He lived in Bad Münstereifel, where a social worker described Ibrahim A. as "naïve and childish", frequently talking about wanting to learn German, find work, and own a dog and an apartment. Ibrahim A. started training as a geriatric nurse, but never finished after he started using drugs.

=== Prior criminal record ===
From September 2015 to January 2021, there had been 24 preliminary and criminal proceedings against Ibrahim A. The charges listed included theft, fraud, dangerous bodily harm, drugs, sexual harassment, damage to property, child abuse, rape of persons unfit to resist, driving without a license, and trespassing. Most of these proceedings were discontinued, but four resulted in convictions.

In 2015, he was convicted of theft for shoplifting a perfume bottle worth €30 and received a monetary fine. On 26 July 2016, Ibrahim A. was convicted of dangerous bodily harm after he attacked one of his friends, a Syrian national, punching and stabbing the other man once in the chin. He received a suspended sentence and probation. Earlier, his application was rejected on 12 July 2016 and because the public prosecutor's office of Bonn had failed to inform the Federal Office for Migration and Refugees of his conviction, he was granted subsidiary protection, which remained in place despite later convictions for other violent offences. In January 2018, he was arrested for possessing one gram of cocaine, for which he received a fine. In 2019, Ibrahim A. was investigated on suspicion of rape through the use of rohypnol, but not convicted. In 2020, he was arrested for injuring a man with a metal chain. By 2021, Ibrahim A. was terminated from nurse training for drug use and kicked out of his refugee accommodation for fighting.

In July 2021, Ibrahim A. moved to Kiel. Upon his new registration in the city, the Federal Office for Migration and Refugees took notice of his criminal record and sought to have his subsidiary protection revoked, but the court proceedings were still ongoing by 2023. Between 2021 and 2022, he continued to be arrested for shoplifiting and knife crime, reportedly homeless and spending most of his time in Hamburg. In January 2022, while in Hamburg, Ibrahim A. stabbed a man in front of a homeless shelter, cutting an artery and tendon. Two days after the attack, he assaulted another man while standing in line to a drug rehabilitation centre, hitting the victim in the back of the head with the handle of a switchblade. He was under the influence of alcohol, heroin and cocaine during both incidents. On 18 August 2022, the St. Georg Local Court of Hamburg sentenced him to one year and one week imprisonment for dangerous bodily harm and theft. A. appealed the sentence, but ultimately served a jail sentence between 21 January 2022 to 19 January 2023 in Billwerder prison. In prison, staff suspected that he had mental issues and regularly drugged him with methadone.

While in custody, Ibrahim A. behaved conspicuously. He insulted inmates and court staff, and other physical altercations took place. Ibrahim A. also began exhibiting strange behaviour such as scratching at the walls with a spoon and claiming that "the devil" spoke to him. On 6 August 2022, a prison officer noticed that Ibrahim A. kept repeating the phrase, "Big car, Berlin, the truth." He asked another staff member on two occasions whether they wanted to 'get under the tires' as well. In a perception sheet in the prisoner's personnel file, it was recorded in August 2022 that he also compared himself to the attacker in the 2016 Berlin truck attack, Anis Amri, saying "There is not just one Anis Amri - there are several, and I am one of them". He was not known to be on any extremist watch lists.

On 19 January 2023, Ibrahim A. was released, as he had completed serving his one-year sentence, and a decision on appeal was not expected in the foreseeable future. Proceedings were ongoing against him for assault. Six days later, the knife attack happened in Brokstedt. He had stolen the kitchen knife used in the attack at a supermarket in Kiel.

=== Motivation ===
The prosecutor's office did not assume a terrorist background, although Ibrahim A. was said to have compared himself with Anis Amri. Rather, they saw the motive for the crime as anger and frustration at his personal situation.

=== Custody and trial ===
While still hospitalised, Ibrahim A. asked police how many people he stabbed and what nationalities they held. He was put into jail custody on 31 January 2023 and after several months of mental health counselling, psychologists voiced suspicion that Ibrahim A. was affected by psychosis. A. was reportedly claiming the "Palestinian secret service" was stalking him, that the interior of his cell was being broadcast on public television, and that the devil was ordering him to commit suicide. A. denied being mentally ill. The assessment was held that Ibrahim A. was still fit to stand trial.

A. was charged with two counts of murder and four counts of attempted murder. On 15 April 2024, the Itzehoe District Court sentenced Ibrahim A. to life in prison.

== Reactions ==
On 22 February 2023, the Schleswig-Holsteinischer Landtag deliberated a proposal Lessons from the Brockstedt case: Improving communication with the authorities and establishing consistent deportation. Considerable shortcomings in the communication and administration of the authorities involved in immigration were found.

In April 2025, Felix Gerike and seven others were awarded a Livesaving Medal (Lebensrettungsmedallie) for their part in stopping the perpetrator.

== See also ==
- Würzburg train attack
- 2025 Cambridgeshire train stabbing
- List of mass stabbings in Germany
