= 2024 Munich shooting =

Shooting in Bavaria, Germany

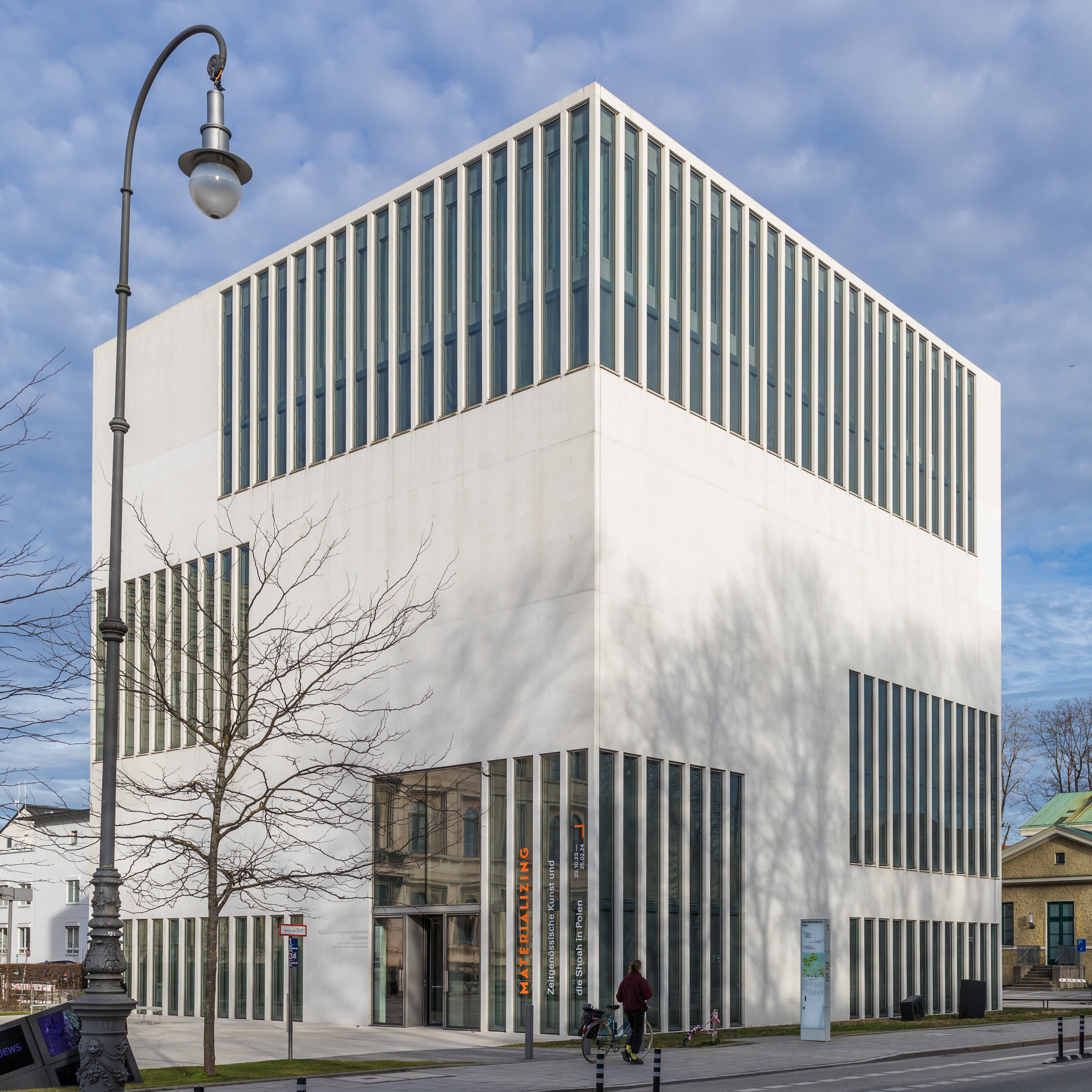
- The Munich Documentation Centre for the History of National Socialism in 2015 National Socialism-Documentation Centre, Munich
- Location: 48°08′43″N 11°34′03″E; Maxvorstadt, Munich, Germany
- Date: 5 September 2024; ~9 a.m. (CEST)
- Target: Israeli consulate
- Attack type: Shootout, attempted mass shooting
- Weapon: Schmidt-Rubin K11, an old carbine rifle with bayonet
- Deaths: 1 (the perpetrator)
- Injuries: 0
- Perpetrator: Emrah Ibrahimović
- Motive: Antisemitism

On 5 September 2024, a shooting occurred in Maxvorstadt, Munich, Germany. The perpetrator, an 18-year-old Austrian national, had opened fire on police after they spotted him wielding a rifle and was subsequently killed without further casualties.

The incident took place at the Israeli Consulate General and the Munich Documentation Centre for the History of National Socialism (NSDOKU) museum and coincided on the 52nd anniversary of the Munich massacre during the 1972 Summer Olympics. LKA Bavaria and State police determined that the gunman was motivated by antisemitism and had planned to attack the consulate when police confronted him.

== Background ==
The crime scene is historically special and also sensitive in terms of security: the NS Documentation Center is located on Brienner Straße and Karolinenplatz. It was built on the ruins of the so-called "Brown House", the former party headquarters of the Nazis. It opened in 2015.

The Israeli Consulate General is right next door. It also moved there in 2015 to an office building that belongs to the State of Bavaria. This move, largely driven by the Bavarian government was a historical marking point: 70 years after the Holocaust, Israel's representative office settled in the middle of the Nazis' old party district, which they had built around their party headquarters.

On 5 September 1972, the Munich massacre happened: Palestinian terrorists shot two men and took nine hostages in the Olympic Village. Around 18 hours later, a rescue attempt ended with the deaths of the nine Israeli hostages, a police officer and five of the attackers. The terrorists wanted to free more than 200 prisoners in Israel as well as Andreas Baader and Ulrike Meinhof of German RAF. On 5 September 2024 there was a memorial service for the Munich massacre at the Israeli consulate, so it was closed at this day.

== Incident ==
1-6: Path taken by the gunman during the shooting. A) NS-Dokuzentrum; B) Former Leibniz Computing Centre; C) Israeli General Consulate; D) Acatech

According to police reconstruction, the perpetrator travelled away from his home in Salzburger Land at about 6:30 via car, carrying a Schmidt-Rubin K11, an older repeating rifle with a bayonet attachment, and 50 rounds of ammunition.

Upon his arrival in Munich's inner city, a police patrol spotted the rifle while driving the opposite direction of the gunman's car, but lost sight of him. The perpetrator parked on Arcisstraße, near the NSDOKU museum, where he fired twice at the building, shattering a window and the glass entrance. The perpetrator walked further to a building owned by the Technical University of Munich (TUM) formerly the site of the Leibniz Supercomputing Centre that had been relocated to Garching several years earlier, and broke a window with another gunshot to break inside, cutting himself on glass while doing so. Leaving the TUM building through another entrance, he climbed a car in an attempt to scale the fence of the Israeli General Consulate, but failed, subsequently firing two gunshot in the consulate's direction. The perpetrator instead entered the nearby Acatech national academy building to find another way into the consulate. Residents filmed the perpetrator walking around the area during this time, visibly struggling with the overall handling of the rifle, at one point nearly falling to the ground after firing a shot due to the gun's recoil.

After exiting Acatech, the perpetrator saw five police officers, on whom he opened fire. In the following shoot-out, the five officers fatally shot the man. A journalist recorded a video from his home office close by, where volleys from a semi-automatic weapon can be heard, which are probably from a police HK MP5. The perpetrator was stopped and seriously injured. The entire sequence, parking to fatal injury by police, occurred over the course of 12 minutes.

The alarmed police cordoned off the area and the tactical police unit SEK from Munich was on duty.

At around 11 a.m. local time, the Bavarian Minister of the Interior Joachim Herrmann (CSU) announced that the perpetrator had been killed.

== Perpetrator ==
The perpetrator was an 18-year-old Emrah Ibrahimović. He was born 2006 and lived in Salzburger Land. His parents were originally from Bosnia and Herzegovina. According to the media, he showed signs of Islamist radicalization and was known by the Austrian authorities.

Ibrahimović is said to have appeared at school as a strict Muslim and to have fallen into arguments with other students on several occasions. He is also said to have expressed violent fantasies. The State Office for the Protection of the Constitution and Combating Terrorism (LVT) in Salzburg had put Ibrahimović under observation since 2023 and placed a firearms ban on him; he circumvented the order by buying the rifle, which was a class C firearm due to its age and thus subject to less rigorous registration, from a private collector in Vienna a day before the shooting. LVT carried out a search of Ibrahimovic's house following the shooting. Material is said to have been discovered that suggests jihadist sentiments; he was supporter of the Syrian terrorist group Jabhat al-Nusra. Ibrahimović is also reported to have had an official ban on weapons. He was not previously known to the security authorities in Germany as a radical Islamist.

== See also ==
- 2016 Munich shooting
- 2024 Solingen stabbing
- 2024 Mannheim stabbing
- 2025 Berlin Holocaust memorial stabbing
