= Würzburg train attack =

Terrorist attack in Würzburg, Germany

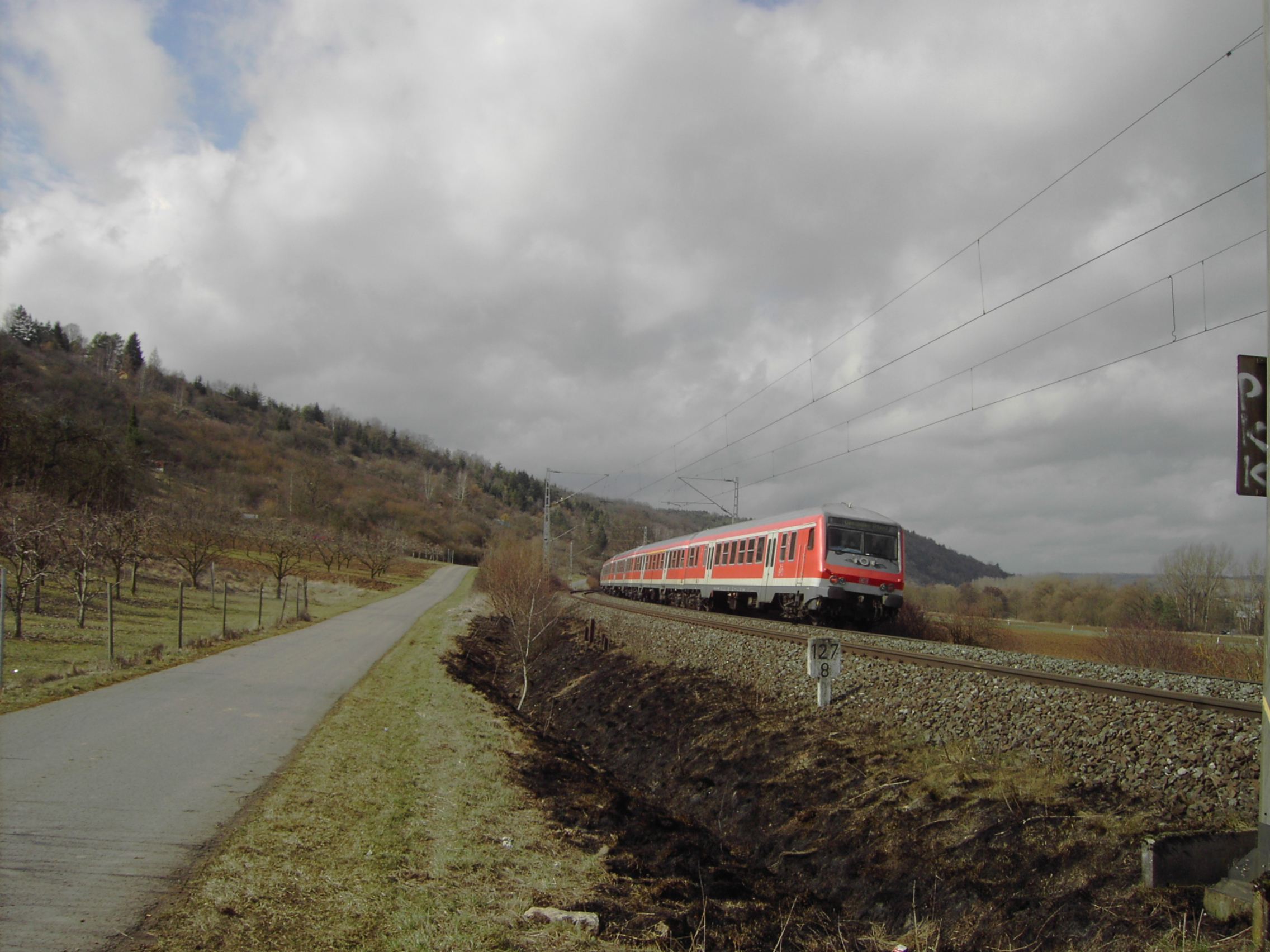
- Regionalbahn between Winterhausen and Würzburg-Heidingsfeld
- Location: 49.75611°N 9.97061°E; Würzburg, Bavaria, Germany
- Date: 18 July 2016; 10 years ago 21:00 CEST (UTC+2)
- Attack type: Mass stabbing
- Weapons: Hatchet, knife
- Deaths: 1 (the perpetrator)
- Injuries: 5
- Assailant: Riaz Khan Ahmadzai
- Motive: Islamic extremism

On 18 July 2016, Riaz Khan Ahmadzai, a 17-year-old refugee from Afghanistan, stabbed and injured five people on and outside a train near Würzburg, Germany. He was shot dead by police soon afterwards, after attacking a police tactical unit with an axe. Investigations revealed he was in contact with members of the Islamic State.

== Attack ==
At about 21:00 local time, on a train traveling on the line between Treuchtlingen and Würzburg, a youth, armed with a hatchet and a knife, stabbed random passengers, injuring a family of four Hong Kongers, two critically. The knifeman then went out of the train, stabbing a woman who was walking her dog, hitting her with the axe twice in the face, seriously injuring her. The perpetrator was located by the police about 500 m (1,600 ft) from the train. The attacker tried to flee and was shot dead by the SEK police tactical unit after they confronted him and he tried to attack them with the hatchet. He reportedly shouted "Allahu Akbar!" during the attack, according to Oliver Platzer, a spokesman for the Bavarian Interior Ministry. Public prosecutor Erik Ohlenschlagern said police heard the attacker call out "Allahu Akbar!" in a recorded emergency call from a witness' mobile phone.

On 20 July, it was announced that Attorney General Peter Frank had taken over the investigation, because of the suspicion that the attacker was a member of Islamic State.

== Victims ==
Five people were wounded in the attack. Four were members from the same family: a woman, her boyfriend and her parents, and were all tourists from Hong Kong. A fifth victim, attacked outside the train, was a local German woman. Fourteen witnesses were treated for shock.

== Perpetrator ==
Riaz Khan Ahmadzai, born on 6 April 1999 (Pashto: رياض خان احمدزی), also known as Muhammad Riyad, was reported to be a 17-year-old Afghan male who arrived in Germany as an unaccompanied child refugee in 2015. He first lived in a refugee camp in Ochsenfurt, then for two weeks with a foster family in Gaukönigshofen 5.6 kilometres (3.5 mi) southwest of Ochsenfurt, both in the district Würzburg. Prosecutors learnt the perpetrator wanted to avenge the death of a friend who had been killed in Afghanistan. Authorities later discovered evidence showing that Ahmadzai was in contact with a suspected Islamic State member and had originally been asked to drive a car into a crowd of people. Ahmadzai declined this suggestion as he was not able to drive the car. Instead, he told his contact that he would plan and carry out a train attack.

Die Welt reported that "he was a devout Muslim," but was not perceived as fanatical. Amaq News Agency published a two-and-a-half minute video, allegedly of him speaking in Pashto, proclaiming himself a soldier of the Caliphate, threatening further IS attacks in "every village, city and airport" and holding a knife. German officials were checking if the man in the video was in fact the attacker. The Chief of the German Chancellery, Peter Altmaier, told ZDF television, "The security authorities expect that this video is in all likelihood authentic".

Police found a hand-painted IS flag at his foster family's home, along with a letter he appeared to have written to his father, which they said read: "And now pray for me that I can get revenge on these non-believers, pray for me that I go to heaven."

== Reactions ==
Authorities temporarily closed the train line between Ochsenfurt and Würzburg-Heidingsfeld.

Bavarian Interior Minister Joachim Herrmann said, "There are witnesses that suggest there may be an Islamic background to this but that is far from clear at this point." Both he and Landeskriminalamt spokesman Fabian Hench declined to confirm the attacker said "Allahu Akbar". Herrmann said it did not appear the victims were targeted for being Chinese. On 21 July, Herrmann demanded stricter control of the German borders. People without valid papers had to be adhered and checked at the border. "We can't let it slide this way anymore", Herrmann said. Hermann also criticised slow asylum proceedings. No fingerprints were taken of the perpetrator and no hearing of him took place.

German Chancellor Angela Merkel condemned the attack as an "incredibly cruel act" and promised that everything would be done by the authorities to prevent further attacks.

Rolf Tophoven, director of the Crisis Prevention Institute in Essen told Le Monde that the perpetrator was "integrated" and wasn't known to police or intelligence agencies. He said he appeared to have been radicalised overnight, perhaps through frustration, hopelessness and online IS propaganda, and that the case appeared similar to that of Mohamed Lahouaiej-Bouhlel, who committed the 2016 Nice truck attack, or Omar Mateen of the 2016 Orlando nightclub shooting, because of their lack of direct connection to IS.

Amaq News Agency, an online presence associated with the Islamic State, citing an "inside source", said the attacker was "a soldier of the Islamic State who executed the operation in response to calls to target nations in the coalition fighting the Islamic State".

Hong Kong Chief Executive Leung Chun-ying condemned the attack as he dispatched a team of immigration officers to accompany the victims’ relatives to Germany. The Hong Kong Economic and Trade Office in Berlin dispatched staff to visit the injured. Leung said he was saddened by the incident and expressed his sympathy.

The attack was linked to the European migrant crisis, and was reported to have raised more questions about Angela Merkel's open-door refugee policy. The attack was compared to a knife attack at Hanover main station earlier that year on 26 February.

Former federal minister Renate Künast of the Green Party was ridiculed by police union chief Rainer Wendt as a "parliamentary smart aleck" for asking why the perpetrator was shot dead instead of arrested alive.

== See also ==
- List of Islamist terrorist attacks
- List of terrorist incidents in July 2016
- 2021 Würzburg stabbing
- Munich knife attack
- 2016 Reutlingen knife attack
- Immigration and crime in Germany
- 2017 Düsseldorf axe attack
