= Subsidiary protection =

International protection for non-refugees seeking asylum

Subsidiary protection is international protection for persons seeking asylum who do not qualify as refugees. In European law, Directive 2004/83/EC defines the minimum standards for qualifying for subsidiary protection status. The Directive was later added to with Directive 2011/95/EU, which states that uniform, European states for persons eligible for subsidiary protection and the content of the protection granted.

In the European Union, a person eligible for subsidiary protection status means a third country national or stateless who would face a real risk of suffering serious harm if they returned to the country of origin. Serious harm is defined, according to the Code of Entry and Residence of Foreigners and of the Right to Asylum, as the risk of: "(a) death penalty or execution; or (b) torture or inhuman or degrading treatment or punishment of an applicant in the country of origin; or (c) serious and individual threat to a civilian's life or person by reasons of indiscriminate violence in situations of international or internal armed conflict."

According to the Universal Declaration of Human Rights, everyone has a right to seek asylum from persecution. The person granted refugee status, however, is defined by the Convention and Protocol Relating to the Status of Refugees as a person who risks being persecuted for reasons of race, religion, nationality, membership of a particular social group or political opinion in his or her country of origin.

== Exclusions from Subsidiary Protection Status ==
A person is excluded from subsidiary protection if the European Member State believes that they have committed a serious crime there, are guilty of acts contrary the Charter of the United Nations' article 1 and 2, if they are a danger to the society, or if they have committed a crime against humanity.

Furthermore, the subsidiary protection status may be removed from persons when the circumstances leading to the protection status have ceased to exist or have changed so that the person no longer faces a risk of serious harm.

== France ==
Since 2003, the subsidiary protection is given by the French Office for the Protection of Refugees and Stateless Persons, or OFPRA (Office français de protection des réfugiés et des apatrides). It can also be given by decision of the National Court for Right of Asylum or CNDA (Cour nationale du droit d'asile), which is the institution in charge of the instruction of legal appeal against OFPRA decisions. Both the OFPRA and the CNDA have to consider specifically and systematically the right to benefit from the subsidiary protection as soon as the asylum seeker does not fulfil the legal conditions to be recognized as a refugee (as defined by first article of the 28th of July 1951 Geneva convention).

When they benefit from the subsidiary protection, individuals are placed under the legal and administrative protection of the OFPRA. They will have a pluriannual resident card, limited to 4 years. During the whole period of their subsidiary protection, they can't go back to their country of origin.
