= 2025 Munich car attack =

Vehicle-ramming attack in Germany

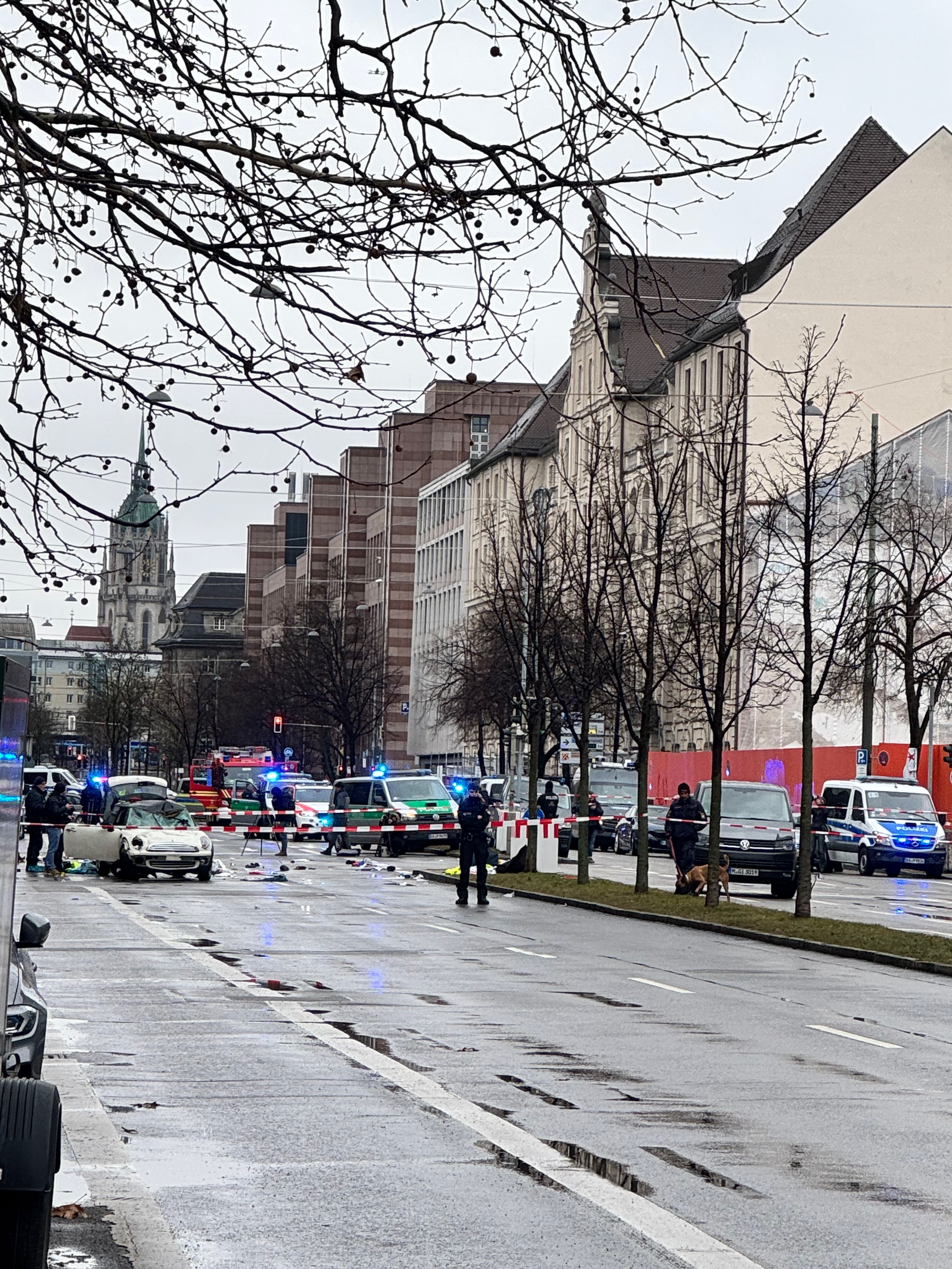
- Picture of the crime scene taken at the intersection of Dachauer Straße and Seidlstraße
- Location: 48°8′43″N 11°33′28″E; Munich, Germany
- Date: 13 February 2025; 20 months ago 10:30 (GMT+01:00)
- Attack type: Vehicle-ramming attack
- Weapon: Mini Cooper
- Deaths: 2
- Injuries: 43
- Perpetrator: Farhad Noori
- Motive: Islamic extremism, retaliation for the Gaza war and Afghanistan war, frustration about living situation
- Charges: Murder x2 Attempted murder x44 Dangerous bodily harm
- Convictions: Murder x2 Attempted murder x23 Dangerous bodily harm x19 Malicious injury x3
- Judge: Michael Höhne

On 13 February 2025, a vehicle-ramming attack took place at a protest march organized by the trade union ver.di in Munich, Germany. Two people were killed and 43 others were wounded. The perpetrator, 24-year-old Afghan asylum seeker Farhad Noori, was arrested at the scene and sentenced to life imprisonment in August 2026.

The attack intensified political debates on immigration and public safety, already important topics ahead of the federal elections, having been the third prominent attack committed by an asylum seeker within three months, after the 2024 Magdeburg car attack and the 2025 Aschaffenburg stabbing attack.

== Background ==
The attack took place in the central Maxvorstadt borough on a stretch of Dachauer Straße. The trade union ver.di had organised the protest march as part of a two-day general warning strike to advocate for an 8% wage increase, higher surcharges, and three additional days of paid leave for employees of Stadtwerke München. The march was headed for Königsplatz, where a rally was to be held. 2,500 people were expected to participate in the protest, with Bavarian Police estimating an actual turn-out of about 1,400. The attack occurred one day before the start of the Munich Security Conference.

== Attack ==
At approximately 10:30 a.m., the ver.di protest was crossing Seidlstraße when a white Mini Cooper drove behind a police vehicle that monitored the tail end of the demonstration. The Mini driver maneuvered around the police car, accelerated, and rammed into the protesters at around 50 km/h. The Mini came to a halt around 23 metres from its starting point, after the bodies of some of the injured caused the wheels to dislodge.

Police ran at the vehicle and pulled the driver out as he attempted to drive again. A gunshot was fired at the vehicle by police, but it did not harm anyone. During the arrest, the driver shouted "Allahu Akbar" to police officers, made prayer gestures such as Tawhid, and recited the Shahada. A Quran and misbaha were found in the car. The attack occurred within the timeframe of "a few seconds".

== Victims ==
43 people were injured, including several children. According to Munich Mayor Dieter Reiter at least eighteen were seriously. The majority were wounded by direct car collisions, with others injured after being struck by victims who had been sent flying by the initial impact. A 44th person commonly counted as injured was able to jump out of the vehicle's path without any physical wounds. One child was resuscitated on site. A 37-year-old Algerian-born Ver.di union member with an Iraqi background and her two-year-old daughter, who were the first to be struck in the attack, died from their injuries in hospital two days after the attack.

== Perpetrator ==
The driver was a 24-year-old Afghan national Farhad Noori, born in Kabul in January 2001, as one of seven children to a Tajik family. He studied up to the seventh grade before leaving the country via Iran. He spent time in Turkey, where he trained as a tile layer, and in Italy before coming to Germany as an unaccompanied minor on 3 December 2016. The Federal Office for Migration and Refugees (BAMF) rejected his asylum application, but he was granted a temporary residence permit. As a result, Noori ws taken into care by an Evangelical youth welfare facility. In September 2017, his asylum application was rejected by German authorities. BAMF had judged Noori's claim of endangerment by an extortionist gang, whom Noori alleged killed his father, to be false due to contradictory statements. He appealed the decision unsuccessfully. In 2020, BAMF again reasoned that Noori faced no threat to his life in Afghanistan and that if returned, his previous career in tiling as well as the vocational training he had received in Germany, would allow him to maintain a "low living standard".

The city of Munich issued a toleration notice (Duldungsbescheid) in April 2021 and a residence permit in October 2021, in part due to the Taliban takeover in Afghanistan and signs of integration on Noori's part. Upon finishing school and vocational training, he worked in the service industry after twice failing sales training. By 2025, he lived in a rented apartment in Solln and worked in security. Noori did extensive bodybuilding in his free time, used the steroid testosterone and also successfully took part in a bodybuilding championship in nearby Augsburg. Noori was active on social media, having accounts on TikTok and Instagram, which have since been blocked or deleted. Noori had over 32,000 followers on TikTok alone, where he presented himself as a fitness influencer. A relative described Noori as a narcissist for his excessive value of body image. Friends of Noori recalled that Noori felt sometimes overwhelmed by the attention and occasionally frequented a brothel. In the months leading up to the attack, Noori began following the social media of two Afghan Islamic preachers, with friends noting his increased focus on religion, giving away Qurans and prayer rugs, and disapproving if others failed to observe regular prayer. Noori began publishing videos with Islamic content afterwards, but also numerous videos that seem hardly compatible with a strict Islamist ideology, for reasons such as music being used in them.

Bavarian Interior Minister Joachim Herrmann (CSU) incorrectly stated that Noori had committed theft and narcotics-related criminal offenses and had been subject to deportation. Herrmann later acknowledged his error, saying that Noori did not have a criminal record and was in Germany legally. Noori reportedly had a residence and work permit from the city of Munich, and the Munich police announced that he was known to them for testifying as a witness while employed as a store detective while working for two companies.

== Investigation ==
ARD's Tagesschau reported that, while German authorities had not previously identified Noori as a political or religious extremist, he was reported to have recently posted "Islamist" material on social media. Authorities were in the process of translating several of Noori's chat conversations from Dari. Interior Minister Herrmann speculated that the perpetrator did not target ver.di specifically and had most likely spotted the demonstration march by chance. Noori stated in jail that he had "no idea" what the protest march was about.

Noori admitted to perpetrating the attack in interrogation shortly after his arrest. The motive for the attack was not immediately clear, although authorities suspected Islamist motives based on Noori's behaviour upon arrest. While no mental abnormalities were noted in custody, investigators noted that doctors who had examined a then-teenaged Noori during his asylum application in 2017 previously attested to psychiatric issues, including post-traumatic stress disorder and impulse-control disorder. The prosecution found that Noori's apparent religious radicalisation had taken place over a short span in fall of 2024 and largely the result of "diffuse fear, anger, and anxiety with his current living situation". It was also found that despite an evident radicalisation, Noori had not voiced sympathies or pledged allegiance to any particular terrorist organisation. Noori told a prison psychiatrist that he had anger issues and felt a "need to destroy", but that this did not influence him during the attack. In custody, staff noted that Noori's religious views were inconsistent and friends described him as easily influenced and "simple-minded". The prosecution alleged both Islamist and anti-Western beliefs, as well as personal issues as the motive in the attack. The Public Prosecutor General officially attributed the attack to a mix of religious, political, and personal motives, compounded by "loneliness and diffuse fear".

Until his trial, Noori was held at the psychiatric unit of JVA Straubing. After being considered fit to stand trial, he was transferred to Stadelheim Prison for the duration of court proceedings. On 26 August 2025, Noori was officially charged with murder for the attack. According to investigators, Noori had "excessive religious convictions" and that he blamed the Western world for the suffering of Muslims, including himself. The trial began on 16 January 2026 at Oberlandesgericht Munich. Noori's defence attorney stated that his client declined to make statements to the incident or his personal background, though he repeatedly showed a raised index finger in a show of Tawhid to the press in court. Also represented in the trial are sixteen co-plaintiffs, including eight of the injured and the husband and father of the two fatalities. The trial was set to take place over the course of 38 court dates, ultimately completing after 34.

Noori's lawyers requested a 15 years sentence at a psychiatric ward, arguing that their client had hebephrenic schizophrenia and committed the attack in a state of catatonia. The argument was denied by the prosecution and court assessors who only acknowledged a "moderately severe personality disorder" and a chronic motor tic disorder, which were not sufficient for diminished responsibility as requested by the defence. The verdict was expected for 27 June 2026, but delayed. On 6 August 2026, Noori was found sentenced to life imprisonment. Due to recognition of particular severity of guilt in the crime, he is unlikely to receive parole.

== Reactions ==
Ver.di chairman Frank Werneke expressed his concern and sorrow. He said that the unions stood in solidarity, with cancellation of similar marches in Berlin and Brandenburg.

Munich started a fund and a bank account for the victims, with the former collecting €500,000 by 26 February. In October 2025, a bench with a remembrance plate was built and a cherry tree was planted at the Flaucher green area in memory of the victims. The family of the two fatalities wrote in a public statement that they were against potential misuse of their relatives' deaths to spread xenophobic sentiments. In his closing statement, judge Michael Höhne similarly described the attack as having encouraged the spread of anti-immigrant sentiment by far-right figures.

Chancellor Olaf Scholz visited the site and stated that the perpetrator would be deported. Bavarian Premier Markus Söder (CSU) said the incident was suspected to be a terrorist attack. Munich Mayor Dieter Reiter (SPD) expressed shock and concern for the victims.

== See also ==
- 2026 Berlin Pride attack
- 2025 Villach stabbing attack
- 2024 Magdeburg car attack
- 2022 Berlin car attack
- 2018 Münster attack
- 2016 Berlin truck attack
