= Taleb Al-Abdulmohsen =

Saudi psychiatrist and mass murderer (born 1974)

- طالب العبدالمحسن
- Born: Taleb bin Jawad bin Hussein Al-Abdulmohsen; 5 November 1974 (age 51); Hufuf, Saudi Arabia
- Occupation: Psychiatrist
- Years active: 2006-2024
- Known for: Perpetrating the 2024 Magdeburg car attack; Ex-Muslim activism
- Status: Incarcerated
- Motive: Revenge for perceived mistreatment by German authorities; Opposition to German refugee policy; Attention seeking
- Conviction: Murder (6 charges) Attempt murder (338 charges)
- Penalty: Life imprisonment

Details
- Locations: Magdeburg Christmas market, Magdeburg, Germany
- Target: Christmas shoppers
- Killed: 6
- Injured: 309
- Weapon: BMW X3

Taleb bin Jawad bin Hussein Al-Abdulmohsen (Note: Arabic: طالب جواد العبدالمحسن or Taleb Al-Abdalmuhsin) (born 5 November 1974) is a Saudi-born former psychiatrist and mass murderer who perpetrated a car attack on the Christmas market of Magdeburg on 20 December 2024, which killed 6 people and injured 309 others. Abdulmohsen is known for his Islamophobic views, anti-immigration stance, and far-right political beliefs. He has identified himself as a vocal critic of Islam in various interviews.

Abdulmohsen relocated to Germany in 2006 to specialize in psychotherapy, applied for asylum, which was granted in 2016. In 2013, Rostock District Court fined him for "disturbance of public peace through the threat of criminal acts".

In June 2026, Abdulmohsen was convicted of six counts of murder and 338 counts of attempted murder and sentenced for life.

== Early life and education ==
Talib Jawad Al-Abdulmohsen was born in Hufuf, Saudi Arabia, in 1974. He hailed from a Shiite family in the largely Shiite Al-Ahsa Governorate.

He pursued medical studies and specialized in psychiatry.

== Career ==
In 2006, at age 32, Abdulmohsen relocated to Germany to specialize in psychotherapy. He later applied for asylum, because he was threatened with death for renouncing Islam.

In 2016, Germany granted him asylum, citing concerns over his safety and rights if he was returned to Saudi Arabia. Even though Abdulmohsen was wanted by Saudi Arabia on charges related to terrorism and human trafficking, specifically allegations of facilitating the trafficking of individuals from Saudi Arabia and Gulf states to the European Union, the German government refused to extradite him, citing a lack of due process in Saudi Arabia. In 2023, Saudi Arabia issued an Interpol Red Notice for Abdulmohsen's extradition.

In 2020, Abdulmohsen accused four fellow Saudi nationals of working for the Saudi government and running a fraud operation by providing women seeking to leave Saudi Arabia with invalid passports. The same year, Abdulmohsen was accused of being involved in smuggling women out of Saudi Arabia. The British National Crime Agency requested information on Abdulmohsen from German law enforcement, citing the allegations against Abdulmohsen, which included human trafficking, acquisition of forged identity documents, and participation in people smuggling operations. The request was declined for lack of burden of proof. In June 2022, the United Kingdom warned the Federal Criminal Police Office (BKA) about Abdulmohsen, as he had boasted about smuggling forced labourers into the United Kingdom on his Twitter account. His criminal conviction for threat and a prior investigation against Abdulmohsen by Landeskriminalamt Saxony-Anhalt were acknowledged, but the BKA again stated that no evidence for human trafficking by Abdulmohsen had surfaced.

Since March 2020, he worked as a doctor in the Federal Penitentiary at Bernburg, a state prison for drug rehabilitation. Since the end of October 2024, he was no longer on duty due to holidays and illness.

Abdulmohsen's qualification as a health professional was questioned by colleagues, but the hospital management took no action. He had in several cases prescribed false and dangerous medications to patients, whose lives were only saved by attentive nurses. Patients had refused to be treated by him for his insufficient command of the German language, which led to misunderstandings. For his consultation of a search engine for every diagnosis, coworkers told the Mitteldeutsche Zeitung he had been nicknamed "Doctor Google".

== 2024 Magdeburg car attack ==
On 20 December 2024, Abdulmohsen allegedly drove a vehicle into a crowded Christmas market in Magdeburg, Germany, killing 6 people, and injuring 323 others. He was arrested at the scene.

=== Trial and sentencing ===
On 10 November 2025, Abdulmohsen's trial began at Landgericht Magdeburg. The proceedings were set for 46 court dates.

On his first court appearance, Abdulmohsen admitted to driving the car during the attack and made incoherent statements about "politicians, violence against women in his village in Saudi Arabia, religious hostilities" and held "tirades about police and media", at one point referencing the 2026 Saxony-Anhalt state election and what he termed "#MagdeburgGate". In December 2025, Abdulmohsen entered a week-long hunger strike in protest of his trial, during which time court dates proceeded without his presence. The statements, along with the attack itself, have been characterized as a means to "elicit attention for self-perceived injustices" by the prosecution.

It was determined that Abdulmohsen had planned the attack since August 2023, after he was fined by a court in Cologne, having threatened the judiciary in charge shortly after the ruling via e-mail, which stated that "the German people would pay an enormous price" for perceived mistreatment of Saudi dissidents. In his final summation before the verdict, Abdulmohsen claimed "torture in jail" claiming staff were poisoning his food, provided him with hard mattresses, and failed to fix unsealed air ducts. Observers noted that Abdulmohsen did not talk about the car attack and had never expressed remorse for his actions. A court psychiatrist diagnosed Abdulmohsen with narcissistic personality disorder and characterised him as an attention seeker. On 26 June 2026, Abdulmohsen was found guilty of all charges and sentenced to life imprisonment, with preventive detention. Judge Dirk Sternberg noted that Abdulmohsen sought revenge for narcissistic injury he experienced after losing the lawsuit against the Atheist Refugee Relief organisation and that he intended to kill as many people as possible to draw attention to himself and his personal issues.

== Personal life and political views ==
Abdulmohsen lived in Bernburg, about 50 kilometers south of Magdeburg and has been described as an introvert with limited social interactions. Saudi dissidents who knew him personally describe him as isolated and aggressive.

Upon coming to Germany in 2006, he was first registered in Hamburg from March that year until January 2008, when he left the country for nine months, causing his residence permit, which had been granted to him for the purpose of his studies, to expire. When he returned to Hamburg in October 2008, authorities granted him a Duldung (toleration) visa for three months, which he overstayed until May 2009. In November 2007, he reportedly commenced an unpaid training at University Medical Center Hamburg-Eppendorf which, according to the same report, had been terminated after staff had expressed concerns about his behaviour and his reaction to criticism of it. From May 2009 until February 2010 he lived first in Düsseldorf and then in Bochum; in Bochum, he received in August 2009 a residence permit for training purposes.

From 2011 to the beginning of 2016, Abdulmohsen lived in Stralsund, where he completed parts of his specialist training. In 2013, a few days after the Boston Marathon bombing, according to the Mecklenburg-Western Pomerania Ministry of the Interior, he threatened the Medical Association of the state with an attack in the course of disputes over the recognition of examination results for his specialist training. This was followed by a search of his apartment, during which electronic media were also checked. However, the investigators found no evidence of "real preparation for an attack". In the same year, he was sentenced by the Rostock District Court to 90 daily rates of ten euros each for threatening criminal offenses. In January 2014, he is said to have appeared at the local office and asked for financial support. He is said to have threatened both an attack and suicide. The police then sought him out for a threat assessment. In September 2015, he is said to have called the German Chancellery and a month later the judicial authorities, complained about the Rostock verdict and became abusive.

In media appearances, Abdulmohsen has presented himself as an ex-Muslim activist against Islam.

In February 2019, Der Spiegel reported on him, that he would – through his web forum wearesaudis.net and Twitter (now known as X) – help others escape from Saudi Arabia to Germany. In March 2019, Abdulmohsen gave interviews to the Frankfurter Rundschau and the Frankfurter Allgemeine Zeitung, in which he was presented as an escape/migration helper. In these he said about himself, "I am the most aggressive critic of Islam in history. [...] There is no good Islam." Also in 2019 Abdulmohsen appeared on the BBC showcasing his website intended to help asylum seeking apostates, "especially from Saudi Arabia and the Gulf region". He founded an online platform to help Saudi Arabian citizens apply for asylum in Germany and claimed that Germany was giving asylum to "Syrian jihadists."

The Cologne-based Atheist Refugee Relief had originally considered working with Abdulmohsen to coordinate aid for atheist refugees from Saudi Arabia. However, this cooperation failed. The Secular Refugee Aid stated that in 2019, members of the refugee aid organization filed a complaint against Abdulmohsen "after the most vile slander and verbal attacks," which led to a legal dispute lasting several years, which Abdulmohsen lost in the Cologne Regional Court in August 2023. At the time of the attack, the case was on appeal before the Higher Regional Court of Cologne. The Atheist Refugee Relief said that Abdulmohsen was not a member of the organization and claimed that he made many false "accusations and claims" against them and their former board members. It also distanced itself from Abdulmohsen "in the strongest terms" and added that its members filed a criminal complaint against him following “the most foul slander and verbal attacks" in 2019.

Saudi authorities have warned German security authorities about Abdulmohsen at least three times between November 2023 and December 2024, but the warnings were ignored, after he posted extremist views on his X account threatening peace and security. The Foreign Intelligence Service of Germany had received a report from Saudi Arabia that Abdulmohsen had announced something big in Germany as early as 2023 and are said to have followed up on this tip. In the fall of 2023, a woman who had been in contact with Abdulmohsen via the Internet tried to warn the police in Berlin that Abdulmohsen wanted to kill 20 Germans. However, she sent her email to the police in Berlin, New Jersey.

In February 2024, the Berlin Public Office accused him of abuse of emergency calls, because he had placed an emergency call for the fire brigade in the building of the Berlin police without an emergency. A criminal order was issued with 20 daily rates at 30 euros each. He did not appear for the hearing on 19 December, one day before the attack.

In an X post from 5 December 2024, Abdulmohsen declared that Angela Merkel deserved the death penalty for "her secret criminal project of Islamizing Europe" and criticized her policies that according to him would have seen German women face similar restrictions as seen in Afghanistan. He also reposted "claims from Alice Weidel warning of a future under Sharia law in Germany, framing her fight as a defence against Islamic dominance." Saudi Arabia issued charges against him for alleged terrorism and facilitating the smuggling of women from Gulf countries to Europe. Despite these allegations, Germany granted him asylum in 2016 and refused to extradite him to Saudi Arabia.

Abdulmohsen shared pro-Israel content on his X profile, he also published a post claiming that "Parts of Syria were lucky enough to join Israel", retweeting a post made by Benjamin Netanyahu which celebrated the fall of Assad.

On X, he had posted an AR-15–style rifle (Juggernaut Tactical JT-15) with a US flag as a profile picture and conspiracy theories such as "Germany is persecuting Saudi asylum seekers inside and outside Germany in order to destroy their lives" and "Germany wants to Islamize Europe." Several well-known officials of the German far-right party Alternative for Germany (AfD) and its right-wing extremist youth organization Junge Alternative followed his X account. Furthermore, he expressed his sympathy on X for the AfD and dreamed of a joint project with the far-right party: an academy for ex-Muslims. He also made a website that tried to help ex-Muslims gain asylum in other countries, and he considers himself an atheist as of 2019.

In a 45-minute video interview on the anti-Islamic US blog, the RAIR Foundation, eight days before the attack, Abdulmohsen spread theories that the German state is conducting a "covert secret operation" to "hunt and destroy the lives" of Saudi ex-Muslims around the world, but at the same time Syrian jihadists are receiving asylum in Germany. In the interview, he said that he was not a right-winger, but a leftist, but at the same time explained that as a leftist he had come to the conclusion that the left were the "worst criminals on the planet".

Abdulmohsen had shared similar right-wing ideological content, including content from German politician Alice Weidel of AfD, Alex Jones, and Elon Musk. He shared a video by German right-wing influencer Naomi Seibt.

In May 2024, Abdulmohsen wrote, "I seriously expect to die this year. The reason: I will ensure justice at any cost. And the German authorities are hindering any peaceful path to justice." On the day of the attack, he posted more videos on his social media profile on X. A few minutes before the attack, he posted more videos. In one of them, he said, "The police themselves are the criminals. In this case, I hold the German nation, I hold the German citizens responsible for what is in store for me." In another one, he said: "I hold the German nation responsible for the killing of Socrates." and "Another reason why I hold German citizens responsible for the persecution I experience in Germany is the story of a USB stick stolen from my mailbox." He also said: "The police themselves are the criminals. In this case, I hold the German nation, I hold the German citizens responsible for what is in store for me."

Abdulmohsen's X account was focused on anti-Islam themes and criticism of Islam while he congratulated Muslims who left the religion. He also described himself as a former Muslim and criticized German authorities for failing to combat the "Islamism of Europe" and supported the AfD. He was described as an activist who helped Saudi women flee their homeland and he appeared to be focused on his theory that "German authorities have been targeting Saudi asylum seekers." He "had been sharing Islamophobic views for years" according to Euronews. German media has identified an account on X, where he argued that "Germany wants to Islamize Europe". Interior Minister Nancy Faeser said that the authorities can confirm that the suspected perpetrator was "evidently Islamophobic".

On 21 December 2024, chairwoman Mina Ahadi of the Central Council of Ex-Muslims stated that Abdulmohsen was "no stranger, because he has been terrorizing us for years." "He has had two lives," Mina Ahadi told the German Press Agency. "If you have been dealing with him for a long time, you have a strange feeling. He has literally terrorized members of the association." Ex-Muslims who had known Taleb, including Mahyar Tousi, founder of Tousi TV, and Iranian German businessperson Maral Salmassi, claimed that he was a Shia extremist who pretended to be an atheist in order to gain asylum, engaging in the practice of Taqiyya in order to hide his true beliefs. Ex-Muslim activists Ali Utlu and Yasmine Mohammed stated that Talha had been threatening ex-Muslims, while Brother Rachid, who often interviews ex-Muslims, stated that he would often make up excuses to avoid giving him an interview.

According to information from several public broadcasters and private media in Germany, people have reported to the police several times because of threats of violence from Abdulmohsen.

Der Spiegel reported that Elon Musk was one of his role models and that Abdulmohsen declared "If you listen to someone like Tommy Robinson or even Elon Musk, and even if you're ignorant of the process of Islamization, you'll think they're conspiracy theorists. But I can say from experience that anything Robinson says, what Musk says, what Alex Jones says, or anyone who is labeled a radical or a right-wing extremist by mainstream media—they're telling the truth." He also wrote, "Me and AfD are fighting the same enemy to protect Germany." Germany's FAZ described him as an anti-Islam activist and told Newsweek that in a 2019 interview with him, he declared that he was "history's most aggressive critic of Islam" and to "ask the Arabs" if they doubted him. An unnamed German official cited by The Washington Post stated that "an X account appearing to be affiliated with the suspect contained content condemning Islam" and described him as a Saudi dissident. Abdulmohsen used an AI avatar of Musk to criticize the German government and praise the AfD.
