= 2024 Magdeburg car attack =

Vehicle-ramming attack in Germany

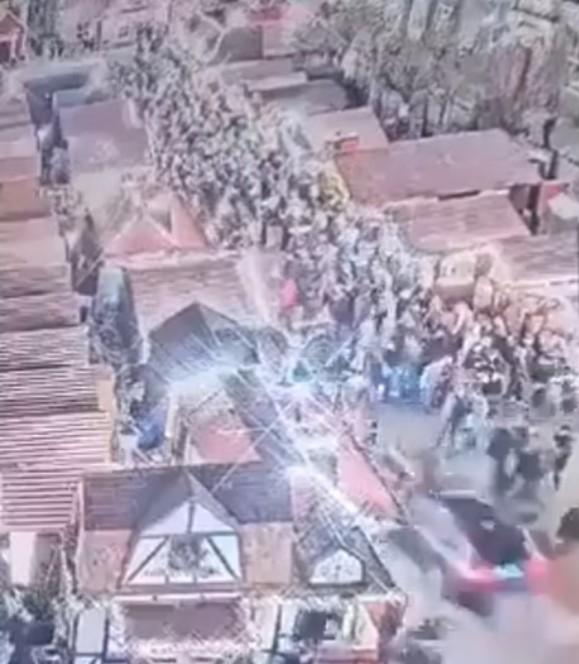
- CCTV image of the Magdeburg Christmas market during the attack. The car is visible near the bottom right.
- Location: 52°07′53″N 11°38′20″E; Magdeburg Christmas market Magdeburg, Saxony-Anhalt, Germany
- Date: 20 December 2024 (22 months ago); 19:04 – 19:05 (CET)
- Target: Christmas shoppers
- Attack type: Vehicle-ramming attack
- Weapon: BMW X3
- Deaths: 6
- Injuries: 309
- Perpetrator: Taleb Al-Abdulmohsen
- Motive: Revenge for perceived mistreatment by German authorities; Opposition to German refugee policy; Attention seeking
- Charges: 6 counts of murder 338 counts of attempted murder
- Verdict: Guilty
- Convictions: 6 counts of murder Multiple counts of attempted murder Aggravated bodily harm
- Judge: Dirk Sternberg

On 20 December 2024, an SUV was driven into a crowd at the Christmas market in Magdeburg, Saxony-Anhalt, Germany, killing 6 people and injuring 309 others. The driver of the car, 50-year-old anti-Islam activist Taleb Al-Abdulmohsen, was arrested at the scene. German authorities have described the perpetrator as an Islamophobe. The Federal Prosecutor General classified the attack not as an act of terrorism, but as a rampage. The driver was sentenced to life in prison for six murders, as well as multiple attempted murders and grievous bodily harm, on 26 June 2026.

== Background ==
Magdeburg is the capital of the state of Saxony-Anhalt. The city holds an annual Christmas market near the city hall and a large shopping center.

Christmas markets have previously been targeted by vehicle-ramming attacks, such as the 2016 attack in Berlin. That attack, perpetrated by the Islamic State, killed 12 people and injured 56 others. Minister of the interior and community Nancy Faeser said in November 2024 that there were no "concrete" threats to Christmas markets, but that it was wise to maintain vigilance.

Two weeks prior to the attack, an Iraqi man was arrested on suspicion of planning an attack against a Christmas market in Augsburg, Bavaria.

== Attack and casualties ==
The path which the driver took in the attack

At 19:04 CET on 20 December 2024, a black BMW rental car, reportedly rented shortly before the attack, was driven into a crowd at high speed at a Christmas market in Magdeburg. The car traveled at least 400 meters (1,300 ft), according to police; the public prosecutor's office would later state that during the attack, which it said had lasted one minute and four seconds, the car had reached a speed of up to 48 kilometers (30 mi) per hour. The driver of the vehicle was arrested at the Allee-Center tram stop.

People who were uninjured helped provide first aid to the injured until emergency services arrived. Others described a chaotic aftermath with "blood on the floor" and people wrapped in emergency blankets to keep them warm. A shopkeeper, who was also a bystander, described the scenes as "reminiscent of a war".

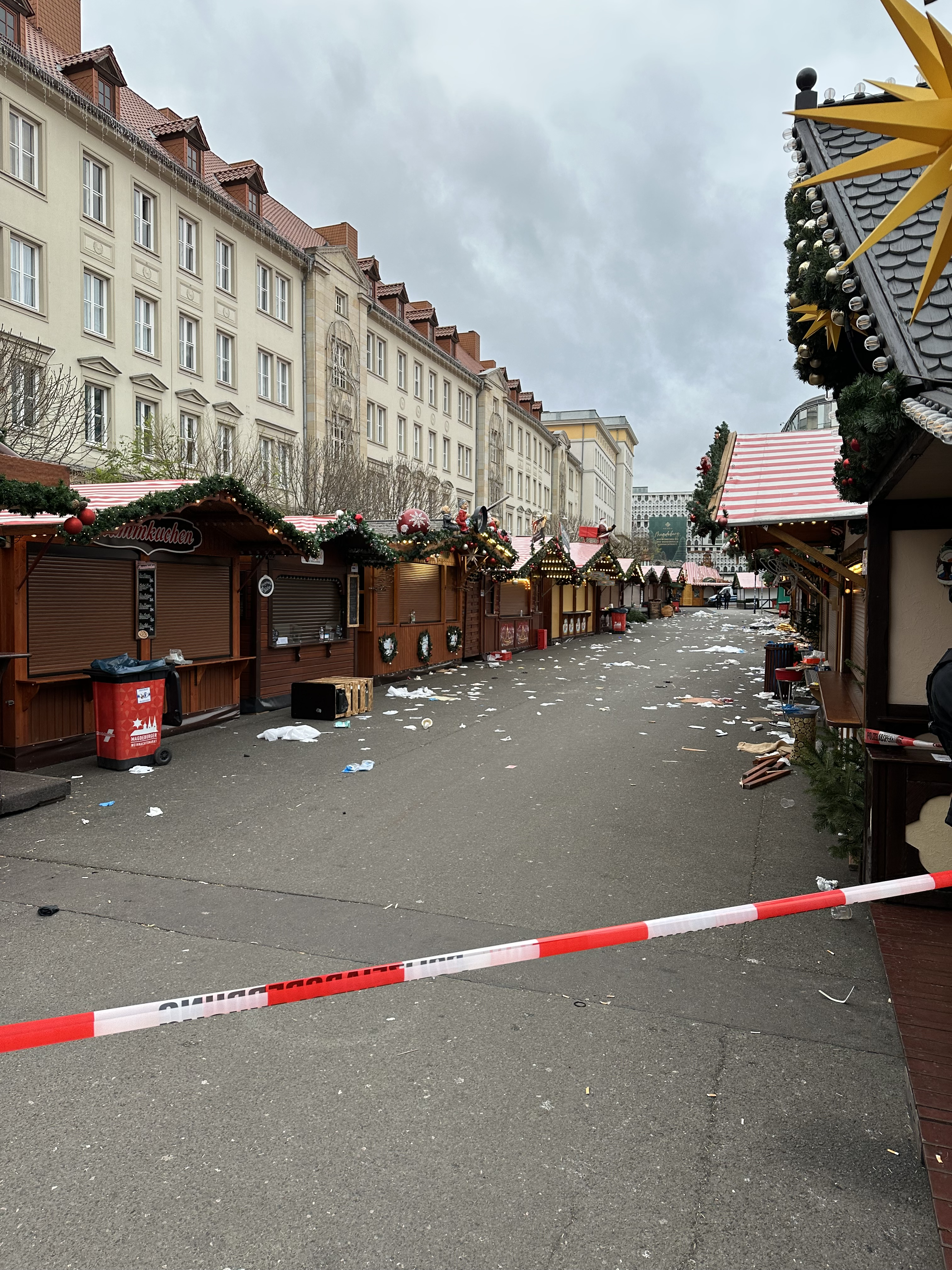
A police line at the market

A spokesperson from the Saxony-Anhalt state government said it was "probably an attack". A luggage item was discovered in the passenger seat of the vehicle and police cordoned off the area following suspicions that an explosive device was inside the vehicle. By midnight, an investigation had determined that there were no explosives in the car.

== Victims ==
Five people were killed at the time of the attack; they were four women aged between 45 and 75 and nine-year-old André Gleissner. A 52-year-old woman became the sixth fatality after dying from her injuries in January 2025. More than 205 people were injured, including 41 in critical condition. On 3 January 2025, the number of injured was revised by authorities to 299. At Abdulmohsen's trial, 309 injuries were counted.

== Perpetrator ==
According to information from the Minister-President of Saxony-Anhalt, Reiner Haseloff (CDU), the Saxony-Anhalt Interior Minister Tamara Zieschang (CDU), as well as Die Welt and Der Spiegel, the suspect was named as "Taleb A." due to German privacy laws. Details released by authorities led foreign media outlets to identify Taleb A. as Taleb Al-Abdulmohsen, a 50-year-old doctor from Saudi Arabia who lived in Bernburg and worked as a psychologist and psychiatrist in a correctional facility in a clinic in Bernburg. He was described by German authorities as "Islamophobic". Taleb A. immigrated to Germany in March 2006, was recognized as a refugee in July 2016 and has a settlement permit and thus a residence permit.

According to India Today, Abdulmohsen is wanted by Saudi Arabia on charges related to terrorism and human trafficking of people from Saudi Arabia and Persian Gulf states to the European Union. Despite Saudi Arabia's extradition request, Germany granted him political asylum in 2016, citing concerns over his safety and rights if he were returned to Saudi Arabia. The German government refused to extradite him, citing a lack of due process in Saudi Arabia. The Saudi Arabian government warned German security authorities about Abdulmohsen three times between November 2023 and September 2024. Saudi officials said he was dangerous and a potential threat to Saudi diplomats. Germany dismissed the warning, viewing it as targeting against a dissident who said he had abandoned Islam which is a capital crime in Saudi Arabia.

Abdulmohsen has been described in media reports as an ex-Muslim opposed to Islam and Muslims. Der Spiegel reported that he used his web forum wearesaudis.net and Twitter to help other Saudis escape to Germany. Abdulmohsen's X account was focused on anti-Islam themes and criticism of Islam and he congratulated Muslims who left the religion. He also described himself as a former Muslim and criticized German authorities for failing to combat the "Islamism of Europe" and supported the far-right AfD party. He was described as an activist who helped Saudi women flee their homeland and he appeared to be focused on his theory that "German authorities have been targeting Saudi asylum seekers."

Abdulmohsen appeared on the BBC News in 2019, showcasing his website intended to help asylum-seeking apostates, "especially from Saudi Arabia and the Gulf region". Abdulmohsen shared pro-Israel content on the Internet. In a 2019 interview with The Jerusalem Post, he stated that he spent 10 to 16 hours per day assisting apostates from the Middle East to claim asylum in Western countries. In a 45-minute video interview that appeared on RAIR Foundation, an anti-Muslim United States blog run by Amy Mek eight days before the attack, Abdulmohsen stated that the German state is conducting a "covert secret operation" to "hunt and destroy the lives" of Saudi ex-Muslims around the world, but at the same time Syrian jihadists are receiving asylum in Germany. In the same interview, he said that he was not a right-winger, but a leftist, but at the same time explained that as a leftist he had come to the conclusion that the left were the "worst criminals on the planet". On Twitter, Abdulmohsen posted a machine gun with a US flag as a profile picture and conspiracy theories such as "Germany wants to Islamize Europe." Abdulmohsen also shared similar right-wing ideological content, including content from Alex Jones, Elon Musk and AfD politician Alice Weidel. According to The Guardian, he had "far right sympathies". Interior Minister Nancy Faeser said that the authorities can confirm that the suspected perpetrator was "evidently Islamophobic".

In May 2024, Abdulmohsen wrote, "I seriously expect to die this year. The reason: I will ensure justice at any cost. And the German authorities are hindering any peaceful path to justice." A few minutes before the attack, he posted more videos. In one of them, Abdulmohsen said, "The police themselves are the criminals. In this case, I hold the German nation, I hold the German citizens responsible for what is in store for me." In another video before the attack, Abdulmohsen said, "Another reason why I hold German citizens responsible for the persecution I experience in Germany is the story of a USB stick stolen from my mailbox."

According to information from several public broadcasters and private media in Germany, people reported Abdulmohsen to the police several times because of threats of violence. According to public broadcaster ARD, Abdulmohsen was sentenced in 2013 by the Rostock District Court to 90 daily rates of ten euros each for threatening criminal offenses. The Federal Intelligence Service (BND) received a report from Saudi Arabia that Abdulmohsen had announced something "big" in Germany as early as 2023. The responsible state authorities are said to have followed up on this tip. German journalist Tim Rohn from Welt also shared on X that in September 2023, a Saudi woman who had been in contact with Abdulmohsen via the Internet attempted to warn the police in Berlin that Abdulmohsen wanted to kill 20 Germans. She erroneously sent her email to US police in Berlin, New Jersey and it was unclear what happened to the tip.

On 10 November 2025, Abdulmohsen's trial began at Landgericht Magdeburg, charged with six counts of murder and 338 counts of attempted murder, including 29 people who were not physically injured during the attack. The trial was held at a temporary courtroom, which finished construction on 24 September, to accommodate the court proceedings due to the large number of co-plaintiffs and members of the press. Abdulmohsen issued an admission of driving the car, and while he claimed to be willing to explain his motive, Abulmohsen's 90 minute-long statement on the first court date was described as "incoherent", which "jumped between religious and political themes as well as personal events", mostly talking about his involvement in women's rights in Saudi Arabia, as well as his hatred of Islam and German authorities.
He showed no remorse and offered no apology to the attending victims, several of whom left the court room over Abdulmohsen's increasingly disconnected statements, although he briefly broke into tears while addressing the parents of the 9-year-old killed in the attack.

On 26 June 2026, Abdulmohsen was found guilty of all counts and sentenced to life imprisonment.

== Aftermath ==
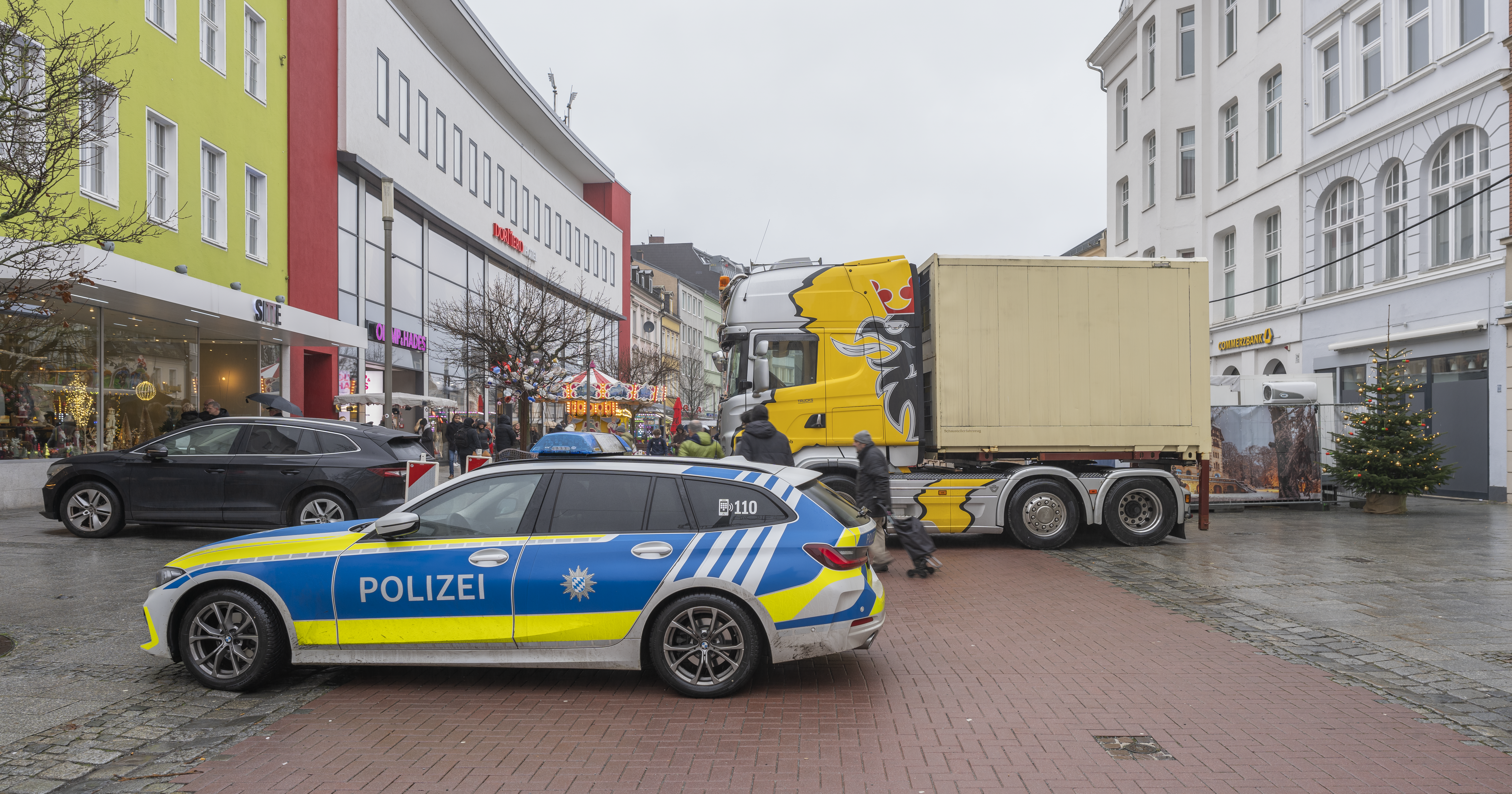
Several Christmas markets in Germany increased security following the attack, including Bavaria.

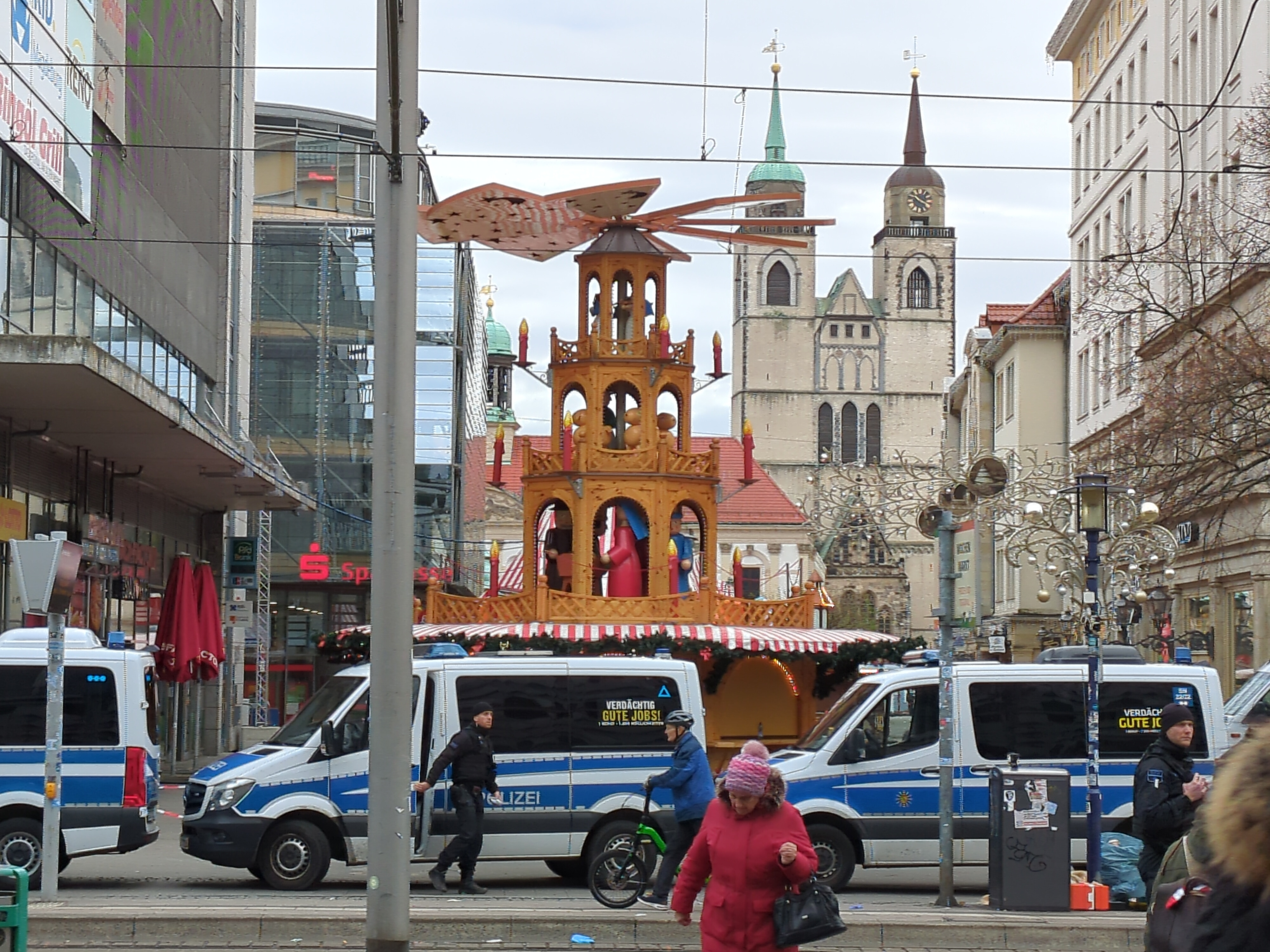
Tram stop in Magdeburg the day after the attack

Hundreds of people created a makeshift memorial with flowers, lit candles and toys, at the nearby St. John's Church. Magdeburg police urged citizens to stay home. Erfurt's Christmas market was cleared, while Halle's remained open with additional security. The New York City Police Department in the US also increased security at Christmas markets in response to the attack.

A memorial service for dead victims took place in Magdeburg Cathedral. Interior minister Nancy Faeser ordered flags lowered to half-staff at all federal buildings across the country. The Deutsche Fußball Liga (DFL) called on all sides of the top two divisions of German football to wear black armbands in memory of the victims and have minutes of silence in several Bundesliga games.

Publications such as Politico and The Wall Street Journal wrote that the attack could reinvigorate discussions of immigration in Germany ahead of the federal election in 2025. After a knife attack in Aschaffenburg on 22 January 2025 by a perpetrator allegedly from Afghanistan, in which a 41-year-old and a 2-year-old died, the Magdeburg car attack, along with stabbings in Mannheim and Solingen that had taken place earlier in 2024, was seen as reason for pre-election debates pivoting away from the state of the economy to migration and domestic security.

In parliamentary hearings on 30 December that had been announced by a senior lawmaker about a week earlier, whose participants included interior minister Nancy Faeser and the heads of the Federal Police, the Federal Criminal Police Office (BKA), and the Federal Intelligence Service (BND), Faeser assured a thorough investigation. She pointed out that the suspect did not fit into a pre-existing pattern, but that there had been indications of psychological issues. She also said that it was still far too early to draw conclusions regarding how such indications should be assessed and taken into account in the future. Several members of parliament who were present at the hearing said that German authorities had received numerous notices about the suspect.

=== Misinformation ===
According to Tagesschau, following the attack, various domestic and foreign actors started spreading false information on social media. They said that before the first official statement by authorities was made, Austrian far-right activist Martin Sellner said that the alleged perpetrator was Syrian. They said that other sources said that the perpetrator had come to Germany as a Syrian refugee during the 2015 European migrant crisis. They said that Sellner and other activists greatly exaggerated the number of victims and said that there were 5 perpetrators of the attack instead of 1 and that 11 people were killed instead of 2. They said that sources distributed video footage of Syrians celebrating the overthrow of the Assad regime in Germany and said that they showed Syrians celebrating the attack. Federal President Frank-Walter Steinmeier was accused of saying a quote: "one should not expose the person who committed the crime ... but listen to the reasons calmly and patiently"; Tagesschau said it was later established that he never said it. They said anti-Israel activists spread false reports that the attack was a false flag operation carried out by the Mossad to boost Western support for Israel. They also said Turkish nationalists claimed that Kurdish militias carried out the attack in retaliation for Germany's alleged support for Turkey in the Syrian civil war.

According to Deutsche Welle, on social media, various accounts said that suspect behind the attack was shouting "Allahu Akbar" as he was being arrested by police. Deutsche Welle say that their analysis of the video recording of the suspect's arrest, together with an Arabic-speaking journalist proved that these words are not heard anywhere in the video. After the suspect's anti-Islam activism and support for AfD had been reported, Elon Musk and other X users said the suspect's activism was a scam to avoid being deported.

=== Protests ===
Anti-migration protests were organized by the far-right at the site of the attack. Protesters carried signs calling for remigration and shouted slogans such as "Wir sind das Volk" (German: "We are the People"). Participating groups included Die Heimat. The protests were actively supported by the AfD, which has called for more street protests.

== Investigation ==
According to Germany's head of domestic security agency BKA, Holger Münch, the authorities have yet to determine a motive. The federal prosecutors would take up the case if the killings were deemed to be acts of terrorism caused by an attacker motivated by political or religious convictions. Münch stated that prior to the attack, police received a tip from Saudi Arabian authorities about a tweet in which Taleb threatened Germany would pay a "price" for its treatment of Saudi refugees. The police in Magdeburg, the capital of Saxony-Anhalt, started looking into it, and "proceedings were initiated" according to Münch, but he also added that the threats were too unspecific. Münch stated that the actions of the suspect appeared to follow "a completely atypical pattern".

On 21 December, the suspect behind the attack was brought before a judge, who behind closed doors ordered him to be kept in custody on five counts of murder, multiple counts of attempted murder and grievous bodily harm. On 26 June 2026, the defendant was found guilty of six counts of murder, multiple counts of attempted murder, and aggravated bodily harm, and sentenced to life imprisonment.

The suspect's potential motivations was investigated by police, including whether or not they were influenced by discontent with Germany's treatment of Saudi refugees, according to Horst Walter Nopens, head of the local public prosecutor's office. Investigators found that he had tried to build connections to far-right organisations in Germany and the UK, including Germany's AfD party as well as Tommy Robinson, the founder of the far-right English Defence League.

== Criticism of security at the market ==
In view of the increased security precautions at German Christmas markets following the attack in Berlin in 2016 – including concrete and steel roadblocks – terrorism experts criticized shortcomings in Magdeburg's security concept, according to which it should be impossible for vehicles to enter areas with crowds of people. The organizers had left an escape route for emergency service vehicles open, through which the perpetrator drove past all the blockades into the market. Professor of Security Studies Peter Neumann pointed out the limitations of a security concept due to its weakest link: "If one access road remains unprotected, all the other concrete bollards are useless".

The Ministry of the Interior of Saxony-Anhalt confirmed that a police vehicle intended to act as a mobile barrier, was parked 30 meters away. A chain to block the gap between two concrete blocks, required by the security plan, was absent. According to research by Die Welt, the concept for the practical use of this barrier made no provision for responsibility or personnel. In some points, the concept seemed "almost bizarrely unprofessional" and neglected the risk of attacks, including in the qualification and assessment of the security personnel deployed.

Criminal charges were filed against the city and the local police for possible misconduct. This could lead to criminal investigations into the security concept, police deployment planning and implementation.

== Responses ==
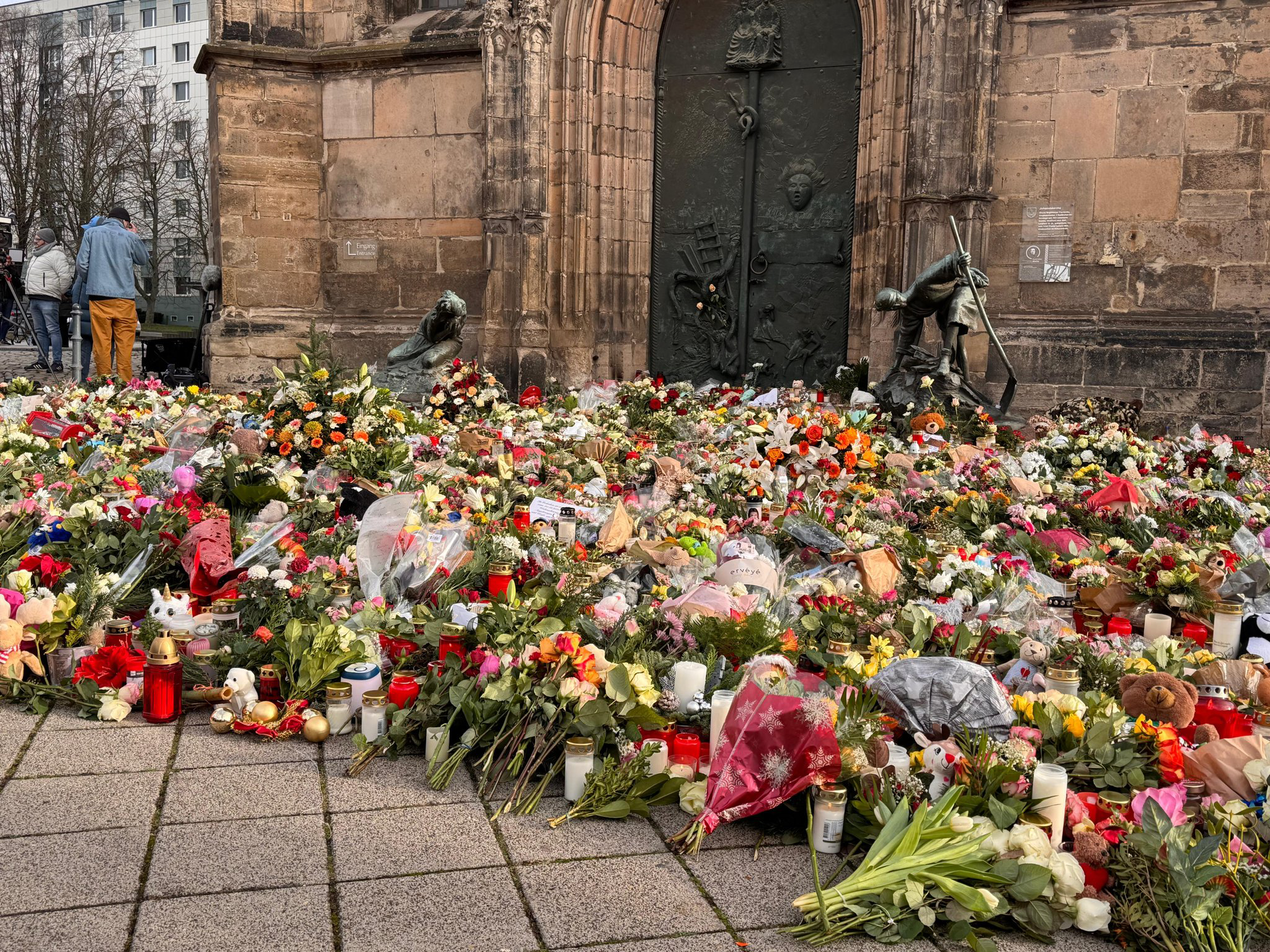
Flowers in memory of the victims at the St. John's Church

=== Domestic ===
Many political figures in Germany expressed their condolences following the attack, including Saxony-Anhalt Minister-President Reiner Haseloff, Chancellor Olaf Scholz, President Frank-Walter Steinmeier, and party leaders Friedrich Merz, of CDU, and Alice Weidel, of AfD. Haseloff and Scholz also visited the site of the attack, along with interior minister Nancy Faeser. In addition, Haseloff was also one of the first to provide the detail that the attacker acted alone. On 16 January 2025, Steinmeier gave a speech in Magdeburg in which he expressed his empathy with the relatives of the victims and thanked the helpers.

A month after the attack, the Landtag of Saxony-Anhalt unanimously voted to install a commission of inquiry, which was expected to commence work in February 2025 and consist of 13 individuals. The commission would be tasked with the safety and deployment concepts that were in place at the time of the attack, and with an investigation of the alleged perpetrator.

The German far right party AfD called for major rallies across Germany after the attack. The AfD's parliamentary leader, Bernd Baumann, demanded that Chancellor Scholz call a special session in the Bundestag on what he described as a "desolate" security situation.

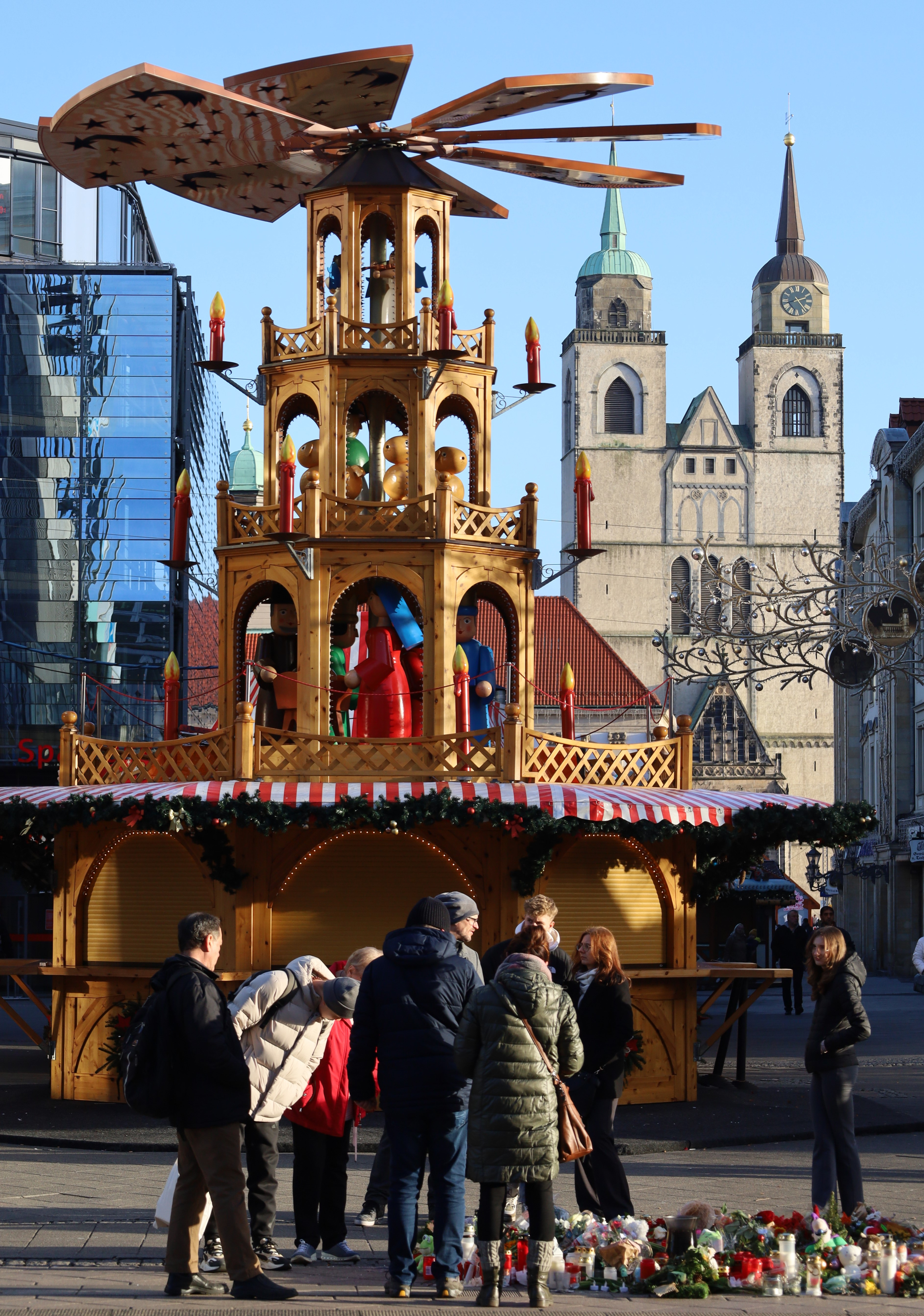
Mourners on Christmas Eve

Sahra Wagenknecht, the leader of the Sahra Wagenknecht Alliance (BSW) party, said that Nancy Faeser, the interior minister, needed to formally explain "why so many tips and warnings were ignored beforehand".

The German-based Atheist Refugee Relief said that the alleged perpetrator was not a member of the organization and said that he made many false "accusations and claims" against them and their former board members. It also distanced itself from Abdulmohsen "in the strongest terms" and added that its members filed a criminal complaint against him following "the most foul slander and verbal attacks" in 2019.

German analyst Peter Neumann expressed surprise towards the unique profile of the perpetrator as a "50-year-old Saudi ex-Muslim" who lived in Eastern Germany, supported the AfD and "want[ed] to punish Germany for its tolerance towards Islamists."

=== International ===
Saudi Arabia's foreign ministry condemned the attack and expressed its solidarity with the German people and its support of the victims.

Condolences were expressed by the leaders of Denmark, the United Kingdom, France, Italy, Hungary, Spain, Turkey, Iran, Poland, the Netherlands, and India, as well as by the Secretary-General of NATO, Mark Rutte. European Commission president Ursula von der Leyen also sent condolences to Germany. Viktor Orbán, the prime minister of Hungary, vowed to "fight back" against open border policies after stating that there is a connection behind immigration to western Europe and terrorist attacks. Orbán also accused EU leaders of wanting "Magdeburg to happen to Hungary too."

Elon Musk and US Vice President-elect JD Vance accused media outlets of downplaying the driver's role in the car attack, with Vance singling out the Associated Press's headline "A car has driven into a group of people at a Christmas market in Germany". On the day of the attack, Musk had stated that, "Only the AfD can save Germany".

== See also ==
- Waukesha Christmas parade attack (2021), vehicle-ramming attack at a Christmas parade in Waukesha, Wisconsin
- List of vehicle-ramming attacks
- List of terrorist incidents in 2024
