= Holzschlag =

Holzschlag may refer to:

- Holzschlag, Austria, village in Schwarzenberg am Böhmerwald, Rohrbach District, Upper Austria, Austria
- Molly Holzschlag (1963 – 2023), American author, lecturer and advocate of the Open Web

== See also ==
- Holzschuh (disambiguation)
