= Magdeburg attack =

Magdeburg attack may refer to:

- Sack of Magdeburg (1631), army of the Holy Roman Empire destroyed Magdeburg
- 2024 Magdeburg car attack, car driven into a Christmas market
