= Holschuh =

Holschuh the occupational surname of German origin for a maker of clogs (wooden shoes). Notable people with the surname include:

- Jan Holschuh, German sculptor
- John David Holschuh, American judge
- Rüdiger Holschuh, German politician

== See also ==
- Hoelscher
- Holzschuh
