= Hulscher =

Hulscher is a surname, possibly of German origin, a form of Hülscher or Hoelscher/Hölscher, the latter coming from Middle Low German holtscher, hölscher for "Holzschuher", 'clog (wooden shoe) maker' (Holz=wood, Schuh=shoe).

It is also reported as a Dutch surname with the same etymology: from Holdschuer, Upper German: Holzschuher. Notable people with the surname include:

- Hans Hulscher (born 1939), Dutch television producer and director
- Leida Hulscher (1892–1976), Dutch music conductor and soprano singer
- Mariska Hulscher (born 1964), Dutch television presenter
- Suzanne Hulscher (born 1966), Dutch civil engineer and professor

== See also ==
- Hulcher
