= Amy Mek =

American activist

- Born: Amy Jane Mekelburg; 1972 or 1973 (age 53–54)
- Education: University of Rhode Island
- Occupation: Activist
- Years active: 2013–present
- Organization: RAIR Foundation
- Website: rairfoundation.com

Amy Mekelburg (born 1972 or 1973), known online as Amy Mek, is an American political activist and social media influencer. She founded the RAIR Foundation, a right-wing platform centered on topics such as immigration, Islam, left-wing politics, and globalism. Her full identity was not known until she was exposed, by some accounts doxxed, by HuffPost journalist Luke O'Brien in 2018, at a time when she had amassed over 200,000 followers.

== Background ==
Mekelburg is Jewish. She grew up in East Brunswick, New Jersey and attended the University of Rhode Island, graduating in 1996 with a degree in communication studies. By 2003 she lived in Manhattan's Upper East Side with her husband. With her husband, she founded a non-profit organization dedicated to overturning the conviction of Paul Cortez, a friend, for second-degree murder, believing him to have been wrongfully convicted. In 2016, she moved to be closer to Cortez, while she falsely presented herself as a psychotherapist in the prison system.

== Anti-Muslim activism ==
She began her Twitter account in 2013, and had gained 200,000 followers by 2018, with endorsements from figures such as Donald Trump and Michael Flynn. Amy Mek was speculated in 2017 by San Francisco Examiner columnist Maureen Erwin and NBC News reporter Ken Dilanian of being a bot account, although she had been interviewed in a New York Times article about women who supported Donald Trump in 2016. She was noted by HuffPost journalist Luke O'Brien to be a very prolific user, tweeting around 25 times a day. O'Brien characterized the majority as Islamophobic posts, in which she "anonymously spread hate online for years", including memes. Her account was banned in France and in Germany due to her postings.

She also founded the Resistance Against Islamic Radicals (RAIR) organization to advance her views, identifying as part of the counter-jihad movement. The organization was later renamed to Rise Align Ignite Reclaim, or RAIR Foundation, with Chris Gaubatz as its president. The group was described by the Southern Poverty Law Center as a hate group.

Mekelburg had her identity revealed in 2018 by HuffPost journalist Luke O'Brien, which sparked a controversy. Mekelburg's husband was fired from his job at the World Wrestling Entertainment (WWE) as a direct result of O'Brien's efforts. A controversy also ensued as Mekelburg's brother, who did not support her views, owned a café, which was targeted with by calls for boycott. Mekelburg's sister-in-law stated, "I'm a little worried about security. We're getting some pretty nasty phone calls and threats and stuff like that." Following O'Brien's actions, he himself and his colleagues were also doxxed and in turn received widespread online threats, as the story was promoted on 4chan and by figures such as Jack Posobiec and Mike Cernovich. The journalism ethics of revealing Mek's and her family's identities have been debated and contested. Media Matters for America claimed the incident did not constitute doxxing, since O'Brien did not provide a phone number, address or email address for her, and since she uses a real photo and similar name to her real name online.

Mekelburg has later been active publishing videos exposing "the truth" about Islam, and interviewing notable anti-Muslim figures such as Taleb Al-Abdulmohsen, the perpetrator of the 2024 Magdeburg car attack. She received a blue checkmark for her Twitter account in 2022, following the acquisition of Twitter by Elon Musk. In 2023, Elon Musk personally responded to a post by Mekelburg showing a video of a Muslim imam who promoted jihad in France which the imam said would make it an Islamic country, with "He is right". In 2024, her repost of a video from the aftermath of the Southport stabbings was the single most widely shared post on Twitter during the subsequent UK riots.

In April 2025, fact-checking organization FakeReporter reported that Mekelburg was one of 30 prominent Twitter accounts promoting content from Gazawood, an Israeli Twitter account which attempts to discredit Palestinians by claiming they are exaggerating or faking their casualties.
