= Holzschuh =

Holzschuh the occupational surname of German origin for a maker of clogs (wooden shoes). Notable people with the surname include:

- Dietrich Holzschuh, better known as *Tile Kolup (died 1285), Holy Roman Emperor imposter
- Lizzi Holzschuh, Austrian singer and actress

== See also ==
- Hoelscher
- Holschuh
