= St. John's Church, Magdeburg =

Historic church in Magdeburg, Germany

Coordinates: 52.1308°N 11.6413°E

St. John's church (St.-Johannis-Kirche) is a historic church in Magdeburg, Germany. It is known for its blend of Romanesque and Gothic architectural styles.

== History ==
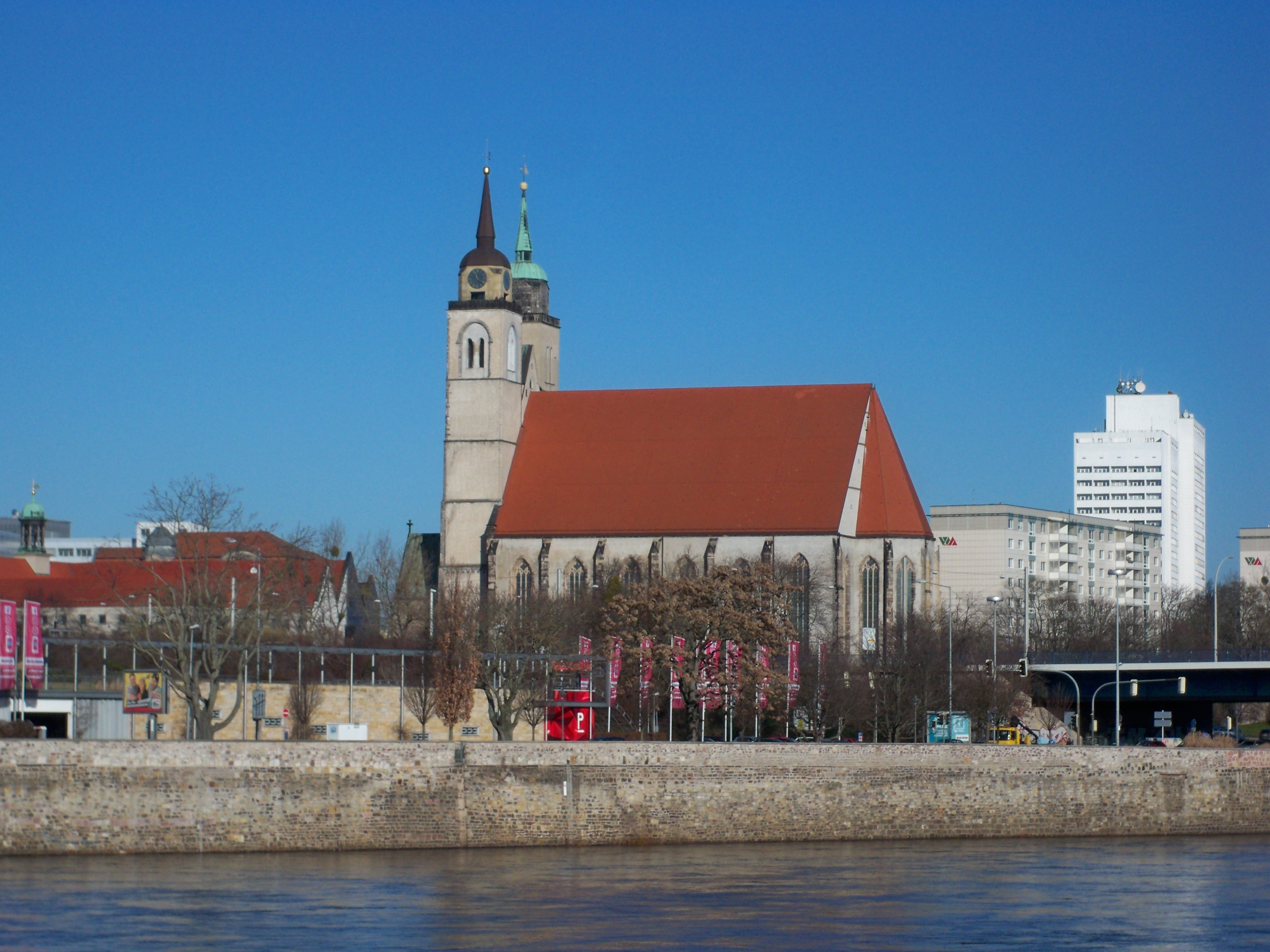
Magdeburg St. Johannis

St. John's Church was first mentioned in 941 when King Otto I donated a church to the monks of the Moritz Monastery. The current structure, however, is not the original as multiple rebuilds have occurred due to fires and destruction such as in 1207 when it got burned due fires and in 1631 when General Tilly's forces caused a siege and significant damages.

In 1525 Martin Luther preached here, leading to the church's conversion to Protestantism. A Luther memorial stands outside the church to commemorate the event.

During World War II, the church suffered further damage in 1945, which necessitated another round of reconstruction. The rebuilding process started in earnest in 1991, with the church being rededicated in 1999 for cultural events rather than solely religious services.

In 2024 after the Magdeburg Christmas market car attack, a vigil was held to mourn the losses of the people killed in the attack.

== Architecture ==
Some features of the church include late Romanesque elements especially in the western section, including remnants of the original structure from the year 1131, and the Gothic hall church design for the building such as the high pointed arches and ribbed vaults.

The south tower, known for its observation deck, stands at a height of 52 meters and is accessible by 277 steps, offering visitors panoramic views of Magdeburg.
