= Hoelscher =

Hoelscher, Hölscher, or Holscher is an occupational surname originating from the North German "Hölscher", the occupational name for a maker of clogs (wooden shoes), which in turn comes from the Middle Low German "holsche" (prefix holt- meaning "wood"; suffix -scho meaning "shoe"; with the agent noun suffix "-er"). People with the name Hoelscher or its variants include:

- Bud Holscher (born 1931), American golfer
- Cindy Holscher (born 1969), American politician
- David Hoelscher (born 1975), American football defensive tackle
- Douglas Hoelscher, American political aide
- Gustav Hölscher (1877–1955), German theologian
- Heinz Hölscher (1925–2021), German cinematographer
- Knud Holscher (born 1930), Danish architect and industrial designer
- Ludwig Hoelscher (1907–1996), German cellist
- Tim Hölscher (born 1995), German footballer
- Ulf Hoelscher (born 1943), German violinist
- Uvo Hölscher (1914–1996), German classical philologist
- Walter Holscher (1901–1973), American cinematographer and art director

== See also ==
- Hulscher
- Holschuh
