= Viktor Schauberger =

Austrian forest caretaker and naturalist (1885–1958)

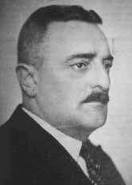
- Born: 30 June 1885; Holzschlag, Austria-Hungary
- Died: 25 September 1958 (aged 73); Linz, Austria

Viktor Schauberger (Austrian German: [ˈʃaʊbɛrɡɐ]; 30 June 1885 – 25 September 1958) was an Austrian forest caretaker, naturalist, philosopher, pseudoscientist, and inventor.

== Early life ==
Schauberger was born in Holzschlag, Upper Austria on 30 June 1885. His parents were Leopold Schauberger and Josefa, née Klimitsch. From 1891 to 1897, he attended the elementary school in Aigen, then until 1900 the state grammar school in Linz. Until 1904, he went to the forestry school in Aggsbach in the Kartause Aggsbach, where he passed the exam as a forester. From 1904 to 1906, he was a forest clerk in Groß-Schweinbarth in Lower Austria.

== Technology ==
Nick Cook visited the PKS bio-technical institute, Pythagoras-Kepler System, in the Salzkammergut Mountains. Viktor's grandson Joerg gave Nick access to the family archives, which included Viktor's books, letters, diary, and patent applications. Besides inventing a log flume, Viktor worked on bio-technical machinery. In 1939, Viktor filed a patent with the Reich Patent Office for a "multistage centrifuge with concentrically juxtaposed pressure chambers," a means of propelling machines through air or water, water purification, or electricity generation. In 1940, Viktor contracted Kaempfer in Berlin to build the machine, then in February 1941, switched to the Kertl company in Vienna. In March 1941, he started working in secret for the Nazis. By 1944, this included the use of slave labor from the Mauthausen concentration camp. At the end of the war, the US apprehended Viktor, and debriefed him over the next nine months. In 1957, Viktor and his son Walter, were invited to the US by Karl Gerchsheimer and Robert Donner, to put Viktor's implosion technology into production. Viktor died soon after returning to Linz.

== Books ==
- Schauberger, Viktor: Unsere sinnlose Arbeit – Die Quelle der Weltkrise, Der Aufbau durch Atomverwandlung, nicht Atomzertrümmerung (1933, Krystall-Verlag GmbH, 2001, Jörg Schauberger, ISBN 978-3902262004) (Released in English as Our Senseless Toil – The Cause of the World Crisis – Progress Through Transformation of the Atom – Not its destruction)
- Schauberger, Viktor & Coats, Callum: Eco-Technology 1: The Water Wizard – The Extraordinary Properties of Natural Water (1998, Gateway Books, ISBN 978-1858600482)
- Schauberger, Viktor & Coats, Callum: Eco-Technology 2: Nature as Teacher – New Principles in the Working of Nature (1999, Gateway Books, ISBN 978-1858600567)
- Schauberger, Viktor & Coats, Callum: Eco-Technology 3: The Fertile Earth – Nature's Energies in Agriculture, Soil Fertilisation and Forestry (1999, Gateway Books, ISBN 978-1858600604)
- Schauberger, Viktor & Coats, Callum: Eco-Technology 4: Energy Evolution – Harnessing Free Energy from Nature (2000, Gateway Books, ISBN 978-1858600611)
- Viktor Schauberger (2006). Das Wesen des Wassers : Originaltexte, herausgegeben und kommentiert von Jörg Schauberger (in German). Baden, München: AT Verl. ISBN 978-3038002727. OCLC 315001786.
