= Suzanne Hulscher =

Dutch civil engineer

Hulscher in 2019

Suzanne Jacqueline Marie Hélène Hulscher (born 1966) is a Dutch civil engineer whose research concerns the formation, modeling, and engineering of large-scale coastal and riverine systems including sand banks, sand dunes, mangrove forests, and the channels of rivers. She is a professor at the University of Twente, where she heads the Water Engineering & Management group, and chairs the Department of Civil Engineering and Management in the Faculty of Engineering Technology. She is also a member of the Netherlands Scientific Council for Government Policy.

== Education and career ==
Hulscher was born in 1966 in Amstenrade, and was a secondary school student in Hoensbroek, in southeastern Limburg. She received a master's degree in physics in 1991 from Utrecht University, with a minor in mathematics. While working part-time as an engineer for the Waterloopkundig Laboratorium near Marknesse, she continued at Utrecht University for a 1996 Ph.D. in physical oceanography.

She joined the University of Twente as a postdoctoral researcher from 1996 to 1999, and remained there as an assistant professor from 1999 to 2001, associate professor from 2001 to 2002, and full professor since 2002. In 2025 she was named as chair of the Department of Civil Engineering and Management.

She has been a member of the Netherlands Scientific Council for Government Policy since 2019.

== Recognition ==
Portrait as a member of the Young Academy of the KNAW, in 2005

Hulscher was the 2002 recipient of the Minerva Prize of the Dutch Physics Council, given annually to a young female or non-binary Dutch physicist.

After previous membership in the Young Academy of the Royal Netherlands Academy of Arts and Sciences (KNAW), Hulscher was elected as a KNAW member in 2017. She is also a member of the Koninklijke Hollandsche Maatschappij der Wetenschappen, and a Fellow of the Netherlands Academy of Engineering.
