= Holzschlag, Austria =

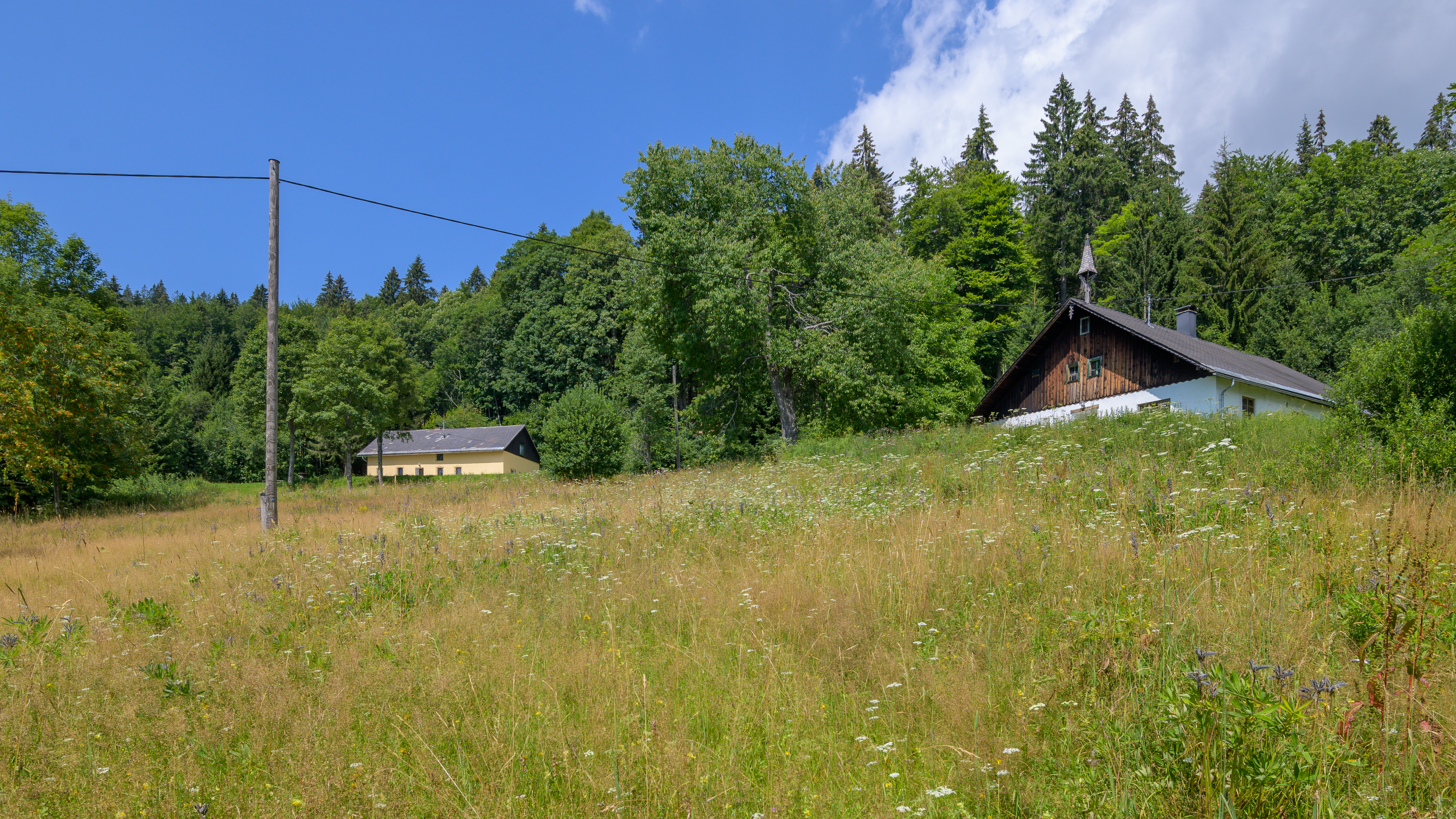

Holzschlag is a village (Ortschaft) in Schwarzenberg am Böhmerwald, Rohrbach District, Upper Austria, Austria. The village is located on Austria's border with the Czech Republic. Inventor Viktor Schauberger was born in Holzschlag in 1885. As of 1 January 2019, the village had no permanent population.
