= Rüdiger Holschuh =

German politician

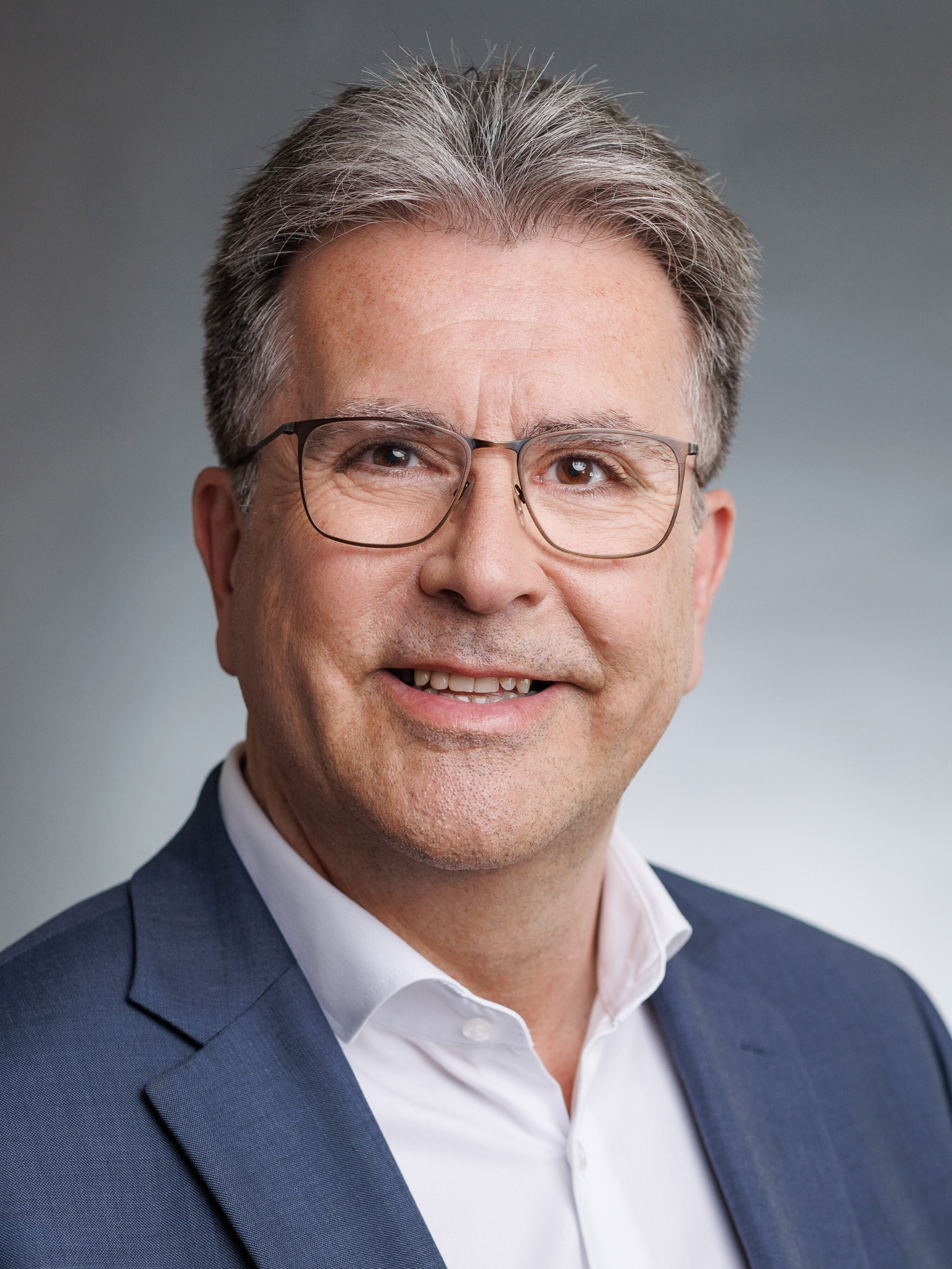
Rüdiger Holschuh (2022)

Rüdiger Holschuh (July 27, 1967 in Eberbach) is a German administrative specialist and politician from the Social Democratic Party. Since 2021, he has been a member of the Landtag of Hesse, replacing Nancy Faeser. He was previously a member of parliament between 2014 and 2019.

== Life ==
Rüdiger Holschuh grew up in Oberzent-Gammelsbach and attended school there. After the Abitur examination at the Odenwaldkreis Vocational Schools and military service, he joined the city administration of Beerfelden in 1989. He worked in administration until his election to the Hessian state parliament in 2013. Since 2019, he worked as a regional manager and headed the office of the representation of SPD state parliamentarians in Odenwald.

== Political career ==
Holschuh joined the youth wing of the SPD at the age of 18. He has been a member of the district council of Odenwald since 1996, serving as its chairman since 2003. Since November 2021, he has been Vice President of the Hessian County association.

In the state election in Hesse in 2013, he contested the Odenwald constituency. He lost to CDU candidate Judith Lannert, but was able to move into the state parliament via an SPD list place.

In the state election in Hesse 2018, after considerable losses of his party, he was initially no longer able to move into the Hessian state parliament via the state list. He narrowly lost the constituency mandate to CDU candidate Sandra Funken, who won with a lead of 99 votes. On the 9th December 2021, he moved to the state parliament for Nancy Faeser, who became Federal Minister of the Interior in the Scholz cabinet.
