= Magdeburg Christmas market =

Christmas market in Germany

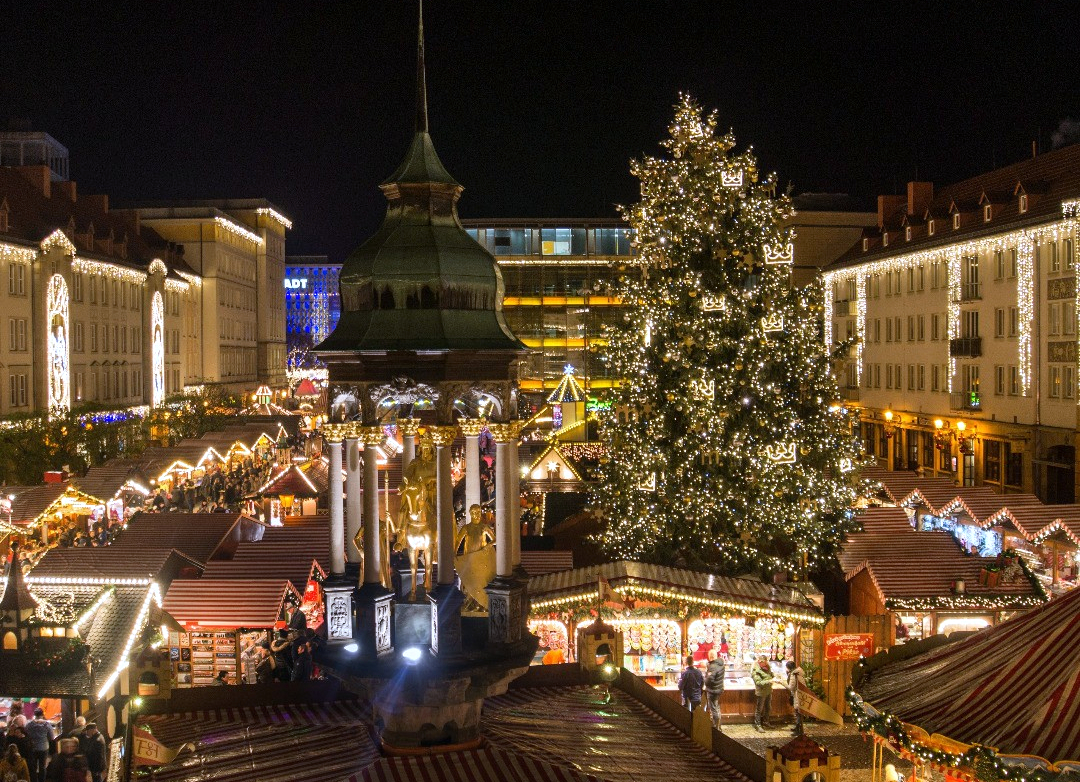
View in 2019

The Magdeburg Christmas market (German: Magdeburger Weihnachtsmarkt) is a Christmas market taking place annually in Magdeburg, Germany, at the Old Market Square. It is the largest Christmas market in the German state of Saxony-Anhalt, with more than two million annual visitors and over 125 Christmas stands.

== History ==
Magdeburg's Christmas market dates back to a late medieval sales fair, which gave the people of Magdeburg the opportunity to stock up on food before winter. In the middle of the 20th century, it became a pre-Christmas custom. In the beginning, it took place in the area of the Alter Markt (Old Market). After large parts of Magdeburg were bombed in 1945, the Christmas market was moved to the Leiterstraße. In the 1970s, it was moved back to the Alter Markt and also to the Zentraler Platz. After the construction of the Allee-Center on the Central Square in 1995, it has only been held on the Alter Markt since then. On December 26, 2012, Germany's longest Christmas song was performed on the Magdeburg Christmas market by artists, celebrities and the Christmas market band; the song was created on the initiative of the Volksstimme newspaper, whereby readers of the magazine wrote additional verses to the melody of the German christmas carol Kling, Glöckchen, klingelingeling. In 2015, the Magdeburg Christmas market had over one million visitors.

== Attack ==
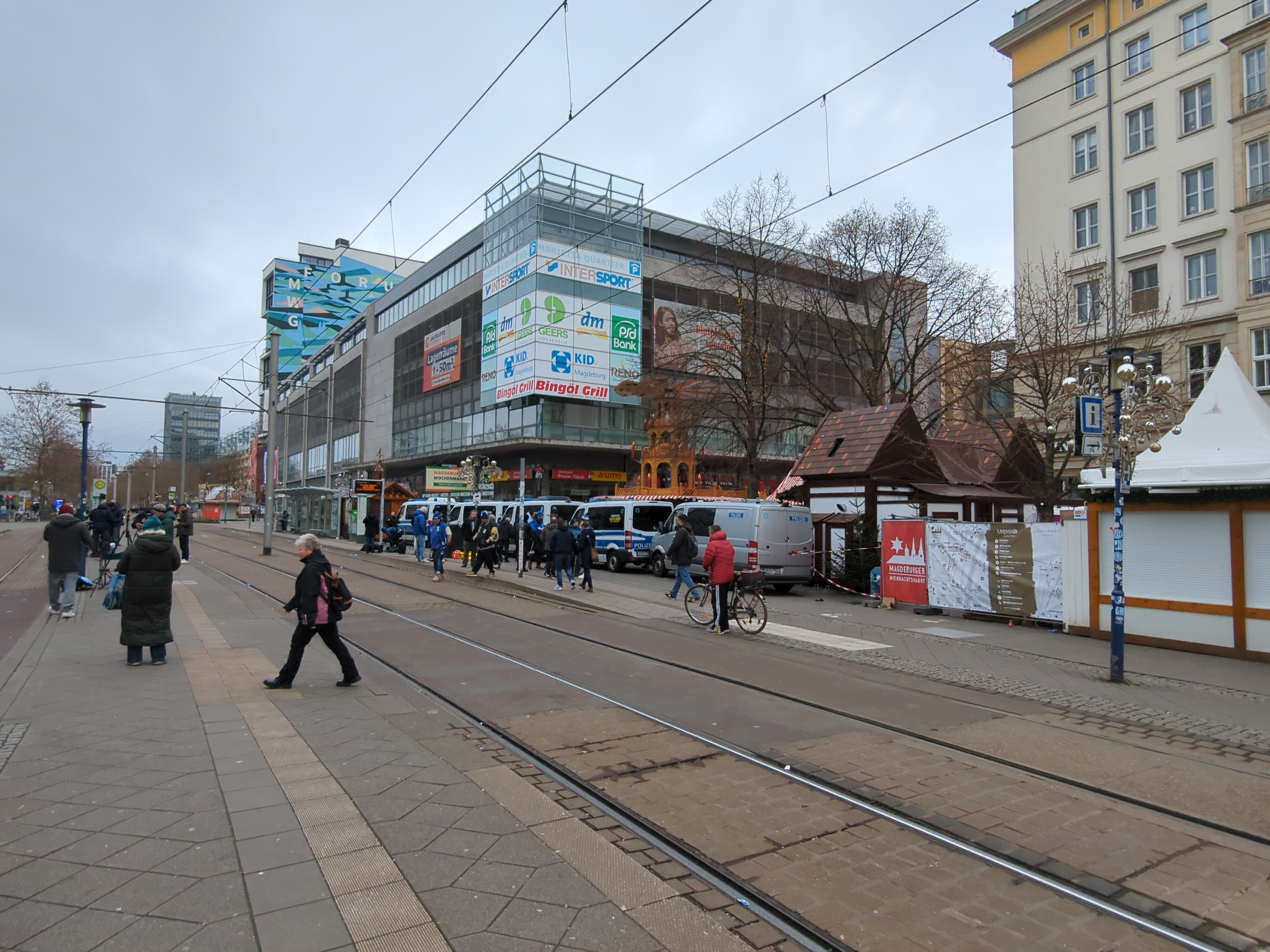
Police cars at the Christmas market one day after the 2024 car attack

On December 20, 2024, a Saudi man drove his car into a crowd at the market, killing 6 people and injuring 299 others. The Christmas market was subsequently closed prematurely for the rest of the season.

== Attractions (gallery) ==
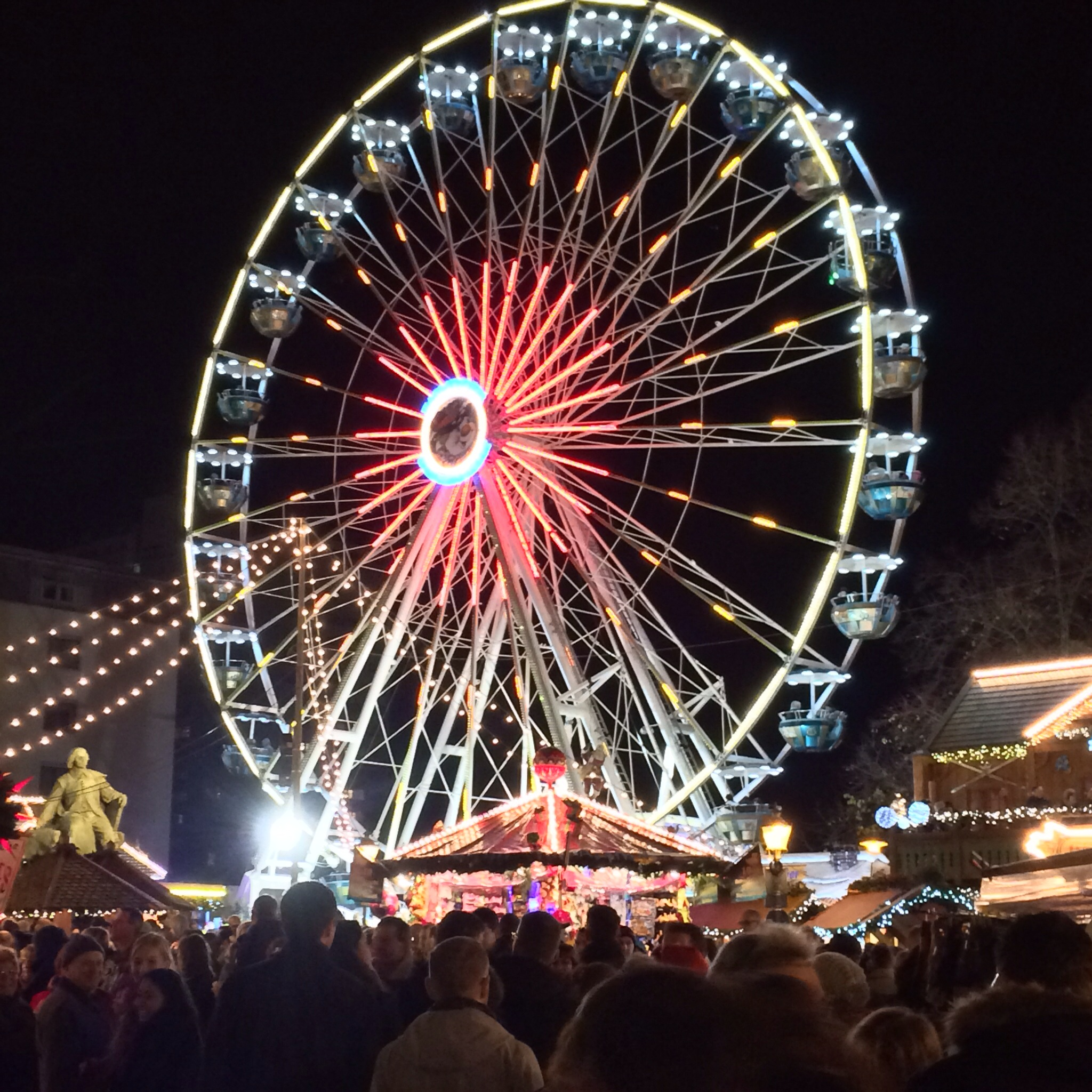
Ferris wheel in 2011

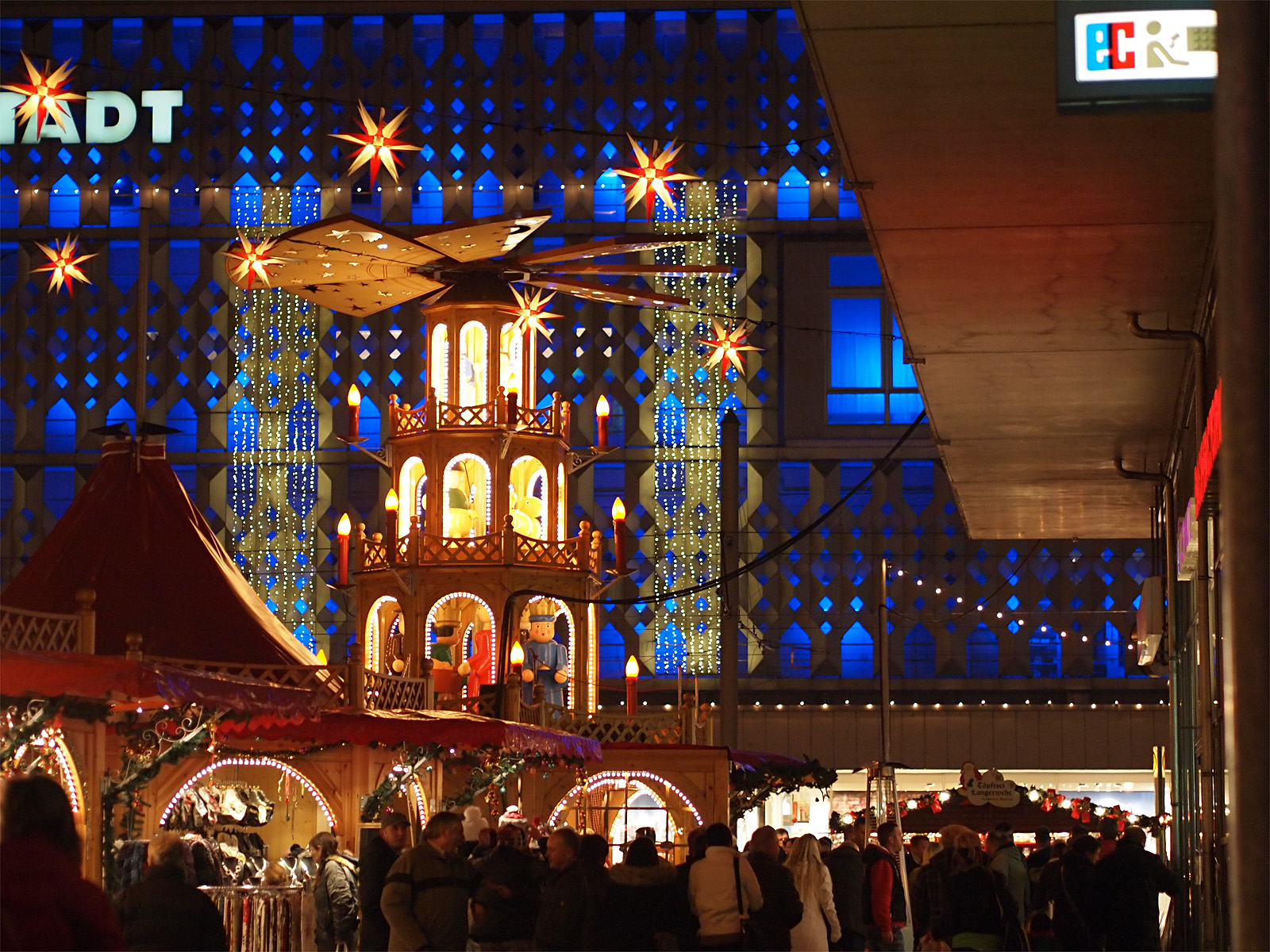
Christmas pyramid in 2013

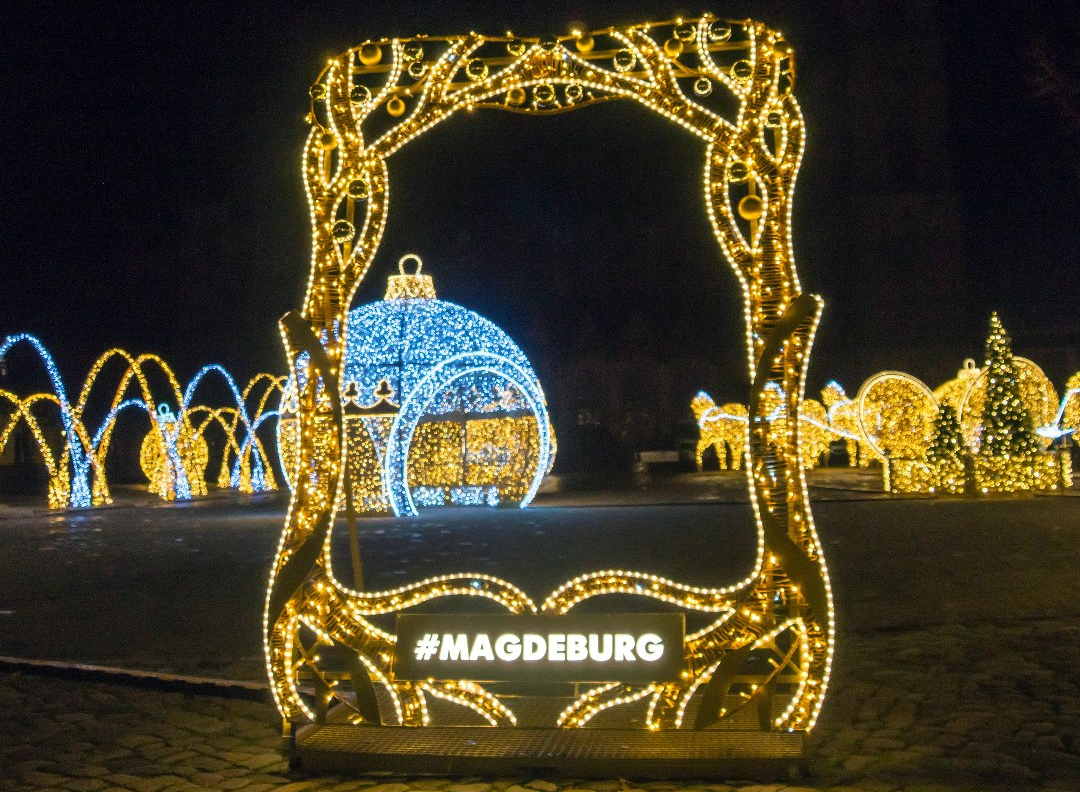
A part of the Lichterwelt (World of Lights) in 2019
