= German refugee policy =

The term Flüchtlingspolitik refers to the legal provisions and the handling of refugees and asylum seekers wanting to enter a country, and/or subsequently staying there for a long period of time, in this case Germany and its predecessor states.

== 18th century and earlier ==
According to the principle of Cuius regio, eius religio ("whose realm, his religion"), the first type of religious refugee was established in the Holy Roman Empire at the Augsburg Settlement. These refugees were members of an "incorrect" denomination and therefore fled to a state which was led by a sovereign ruler who shared their beliefs. Cologne, for example, was a shelter for Catholics as well as for important church officials during the Thirty Years' War (1618–1648).

The Margraviate of Brandenburg lost half of its inhabitants during that war; the Uckermark lost even more, 90%. To balance this loss, the country became reliant on immigration. After assessing the state of the economy, craftsmen and skilled agricultural workers were hired. People who were forced to leave their home land for religious reasons were also taken in. Because of the Edict of Potsdam, Brandenburg took in Huguenots who were expelled from France. Later territories, which were ruled by relatives of the Prussian king, also took them in: e.g. from the Markgraviate of Brandenburg-Ansbach. The majority of the Lutherans from Salzburg settled in the Kingdom of Prussia in 1731–32; other Lutherans and Protestants fled from Bohemia to the newly founded colony of Nowawes (Potsdam-Babelsberg) in 1750.

Before the 1782 Edict of Tolerance, religious refugees from the Habsburg Empire moved to other Protestant areas in the Holy Roman Empire. During the French Revolution, members of the French Counter-Revolution fled to German-speaking territories. The first wave of emigration took place after the events of July and August 1789. In summer 1789 it was mainly the high nobility, especially the King's relatives, and members of the higher clergy and the military leadership, who emigrated. Due to the abolition of the feudal system and the revocation of the Civil Constitution of the Clergy, there was a second wave of emigrants in the summer of 1790. Again, this consisted mainly of the nobility, the clergy and military officers. The third wave of emigration started shortly after 21 June 1791, when King Louis XIV tried to escape to Varennes.

The second main phase of emigration took place after the September massacres in 1792 and the increasing radicalization of the revolution after the King's execution in 1793. More and more members of the Third Estate were now emigrating. Among them were many former supporters of the revolution, including Girondists, who had by then broken away from the new leadership in Paris, or had been victims of political prosecution. There were smaller waves of emigration after the end of the Reign of Terror, caused by the royalist uprising on October 5 in Paris. The uprising was defeated by Napoleon and his troops and prompted the Coup of 18 Fructidor (4 September 1797).

== Empire and Weimar Republic ==
During the German Empire and the Weimar Republic, Germany was one of the countries most sought after by Jews who were fleeing violence and discrimination in eastern, central and south-eastern Europe. The first big wave of Jewish refugees to Germany from the east reached was a result of the Russian Revolution and Counter Revolution in 1904–05. During the First World War which turned Poland into a war zone, there was a second big wave of Jewish immigrants from the East. Due to the Entente powers' blockade, this wave settled mainly in Central Europe, Germany and Austria. "Hundreds of thousands of Polish Jews fled to Vienna and Berlin: children of foreign culture, speaking a foreign language, upholding foreign customs and beliefs." These were mostly forced to come as refugees with nothing to their name, and just tried to scrape a living in any possible way. There are no indications of any correlation between Jews from Eastern Europe and an increased crime rate. The historian Anne-Christin Saß discovered that in the second half of the 1920s in Berlin, Jews were prevented from continuing to move further west in Europe or even as far as the US, as they had originally intended; thus Berlin developed into a world Jewish center. This change not only intensified antisemitic resentment by the right wing supporters, but also triggered defensive reactions of fully integrated, sometimes even completely assimilated, "Jews from the West".

== Fled and banished Germans and "Displaced Persons" 1945–1949 ==
According to a population census in 1950, around 12.5 million refugees and exiles from the eastern territories formerly occupied by the Nazi regime fled after the end of the Second World War, to the Allied occupation zones of Germany and Berlin. 3 million refugees came to Germany from Czechoslovakia, 1.4 million from Poland, roughly 300,000 from the former Free City of Gdańsk (Danzig), 300,000 from Yugoslavia, 200,000 from Hungary and 130,000 from Romania. Long-term residents, especially in villages, often refused to take in these refugees. In August 1952, the Equalization of Burdens Act was passed to compensate the refugees for monetary and job losses. The legal status of refugees and late resettlers is regulated by the Federal Law of Refugees and Exiles (German: short form: Bundesvertriebenengesetz, BVFG; in full, Gesetz über die Angelegenheiten der Vertriebenen und Flüchtlinge; literally: Law on the affairs of the expellees and refugees) inured on June 5, 1953.

Identity card for displaced persons and refugees, groups A, B and C

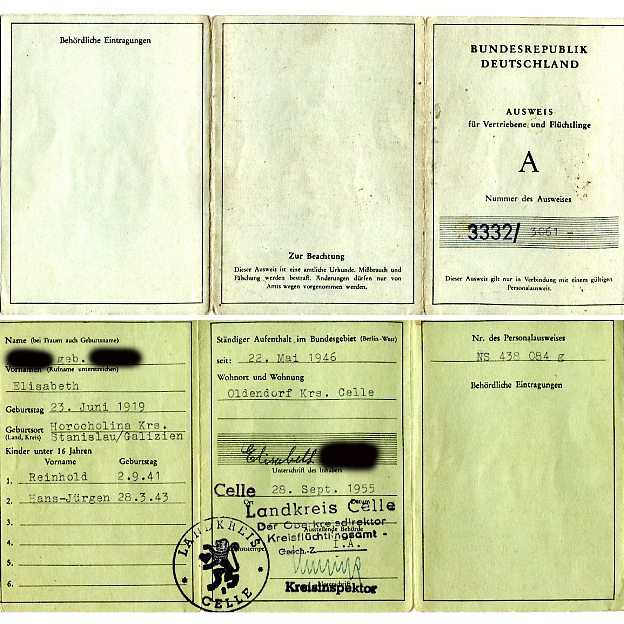
Refugee identity card A. Identity cards A and B were for displaced persons and refugees of the former eastern territories of Germany.

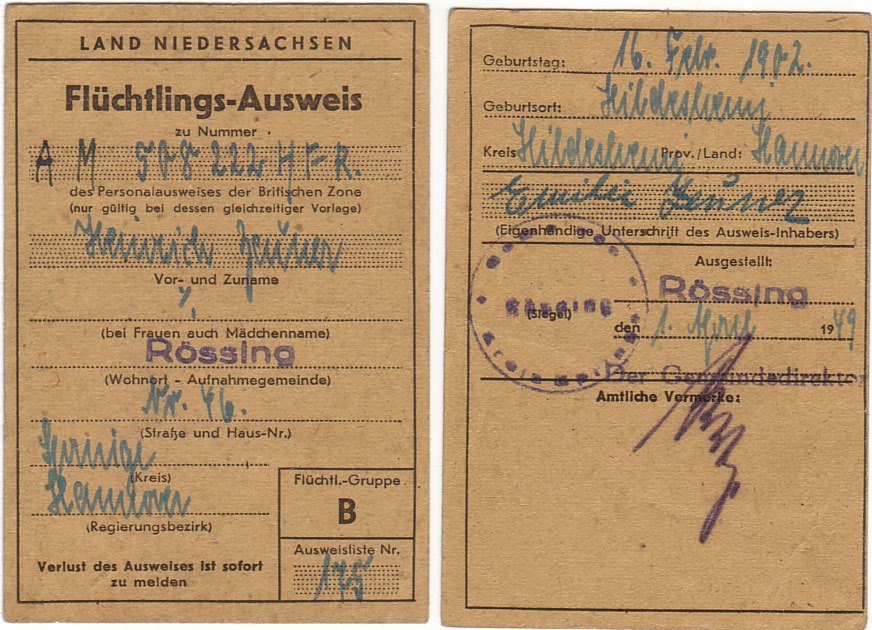
Refugee identity card B

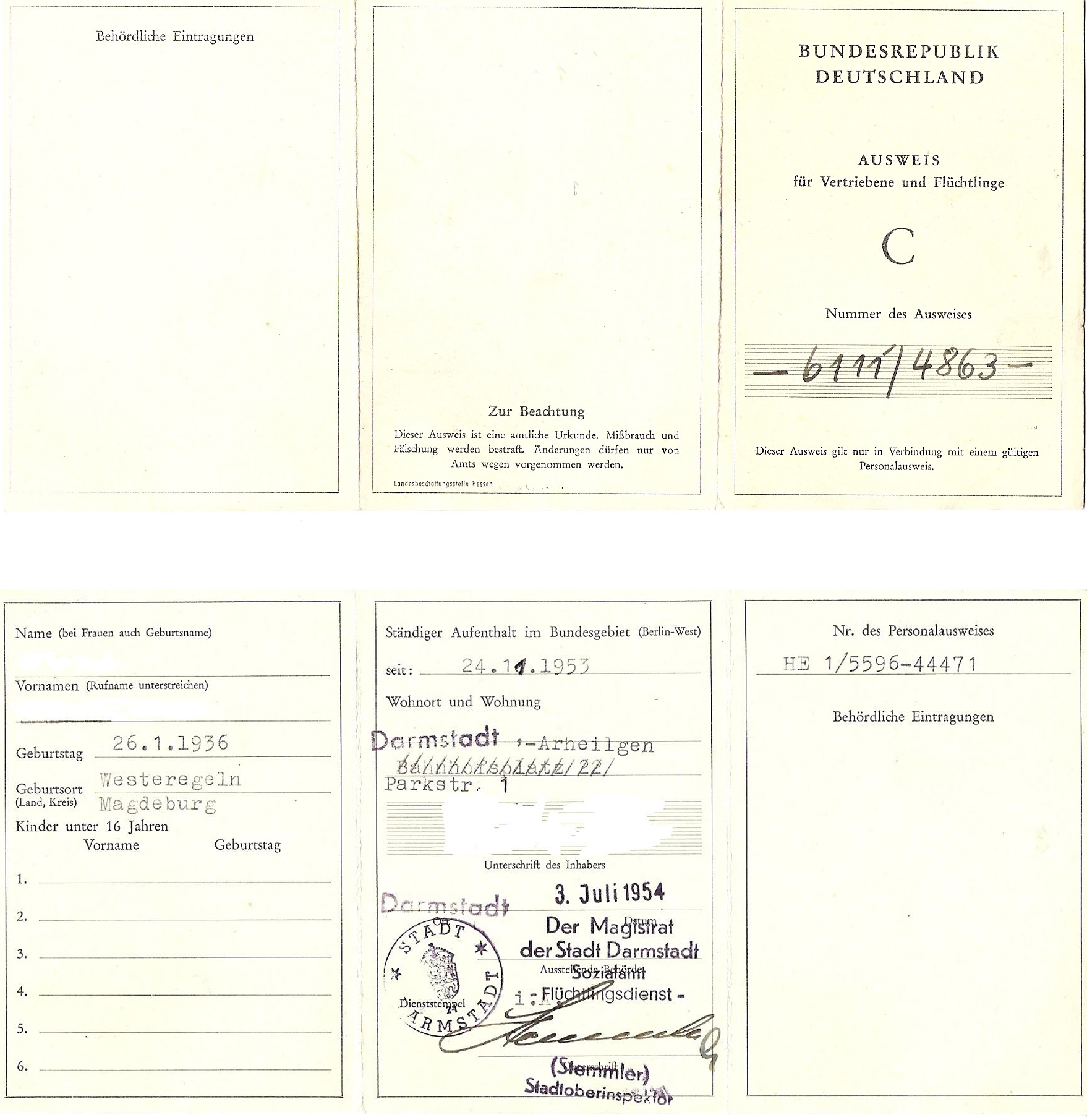
Refugee identity card C. Refugees of the Soviet occupation zone (Sowjetzone) received identity card C.

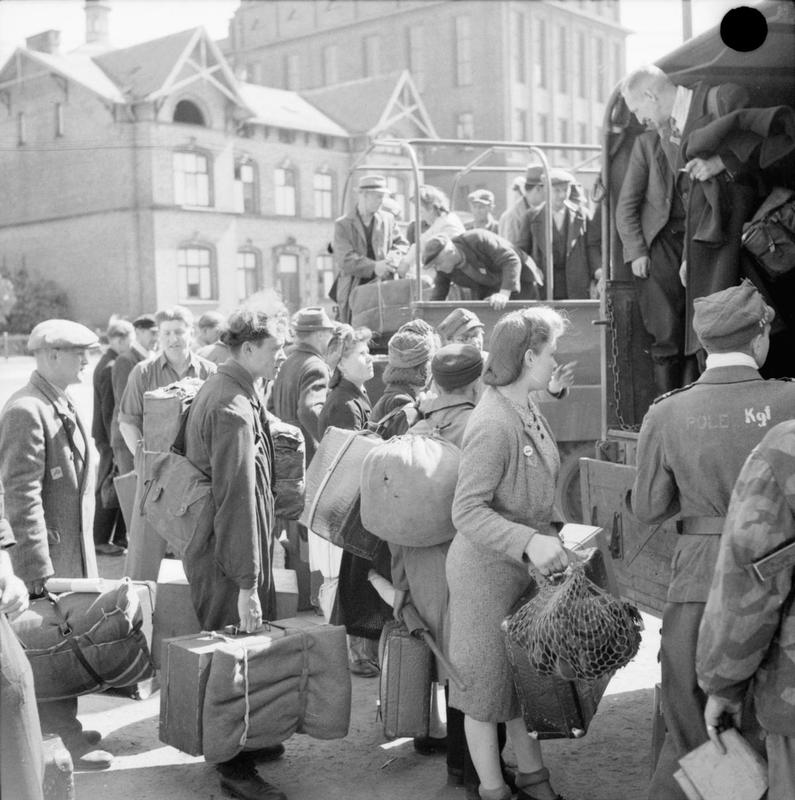
Displaced persons and refugees in Germany

The so-called Displaced persons (DP) played a key role in the history of the German refugee policy post-1945. Most of them were deported to Germany, mainly as forced laborers, during the Second World War. Freed prisoners of war, Eastern Europeans who came to Germany voluntarily after the start of the war and people who had fled from the Soviet Army were considered within a broad definition of DPs. DPs were supposed, and also mostly wanted, to be repatriated into their country of origin. Citizens of the Soviet Union were however repatriated against their will. Polish and Baltic people, as well as the forced laborers from the areas in Belarus and Ukraine who had lived on Polish national territory before the war, had the choice either to go back to their homeland, to emigrate to another country or to stay in Germany. All over Eastern Europe, Stalinist dictatorships were established; that is why many of the Displaced Persons", especially those who were suspected of having collaborated with the Nazi occupiers, would not leave Germany: they feared severe penalties in their country of origin. For instance, the former Latvian general Rudolfs Bangerskis, who later became a general of the Waffen-SS, died in 1958 in exile in Oldenburg. Displaced Persons are called "homeless foreigners" in German federal law, and their legal position, based on the "Law on the Legal Status of Aliens in the federal territory" of 25 April 1951, is similar to the legal position of people with refugee status.

Between 1945 and 1949, a housing estate for roughly 5000 Displaced Persons from Ukraine was built, under the initiative of the Americans,"in the "Ganghofersiedlung" in Regensburg (the former "Göring-Heim" (lit. Göring-asylum) of the Nazis). Similar estates were also then built elsewhere in Germany. There was hardly any contact with Germans outside the camps or estates except for fairly superficial ones. In 1950, the Rheinische Post commented on the resolution of a "Polenlager" (Poles' camp) in Solingen which had been occupied by "DPs", remarking that "the Polish economy" would finally be over; they then remarked that "German cleanliness would soon rule again in the spoiled area""instead of the "post-war eyesore". Furthermore, the DPs from Ukraine were unpopular in many places because they were considered privileged in contrast to the hardships Germany was facing. In addition, some were former Nazi collaborators and formed gangs of petty criminals, controlling the black market, which was important for the supply of the population at that time.

== Refugees from the GDR (East Germany) in the Federal Republic of Germany ==
More than 3.8 million people left the GDR, many of them illegally and at high risk, between 7 October 1949 and June 1990, from its foundation until reunification. This figure includes 480,000 citizens of the GDR who left the country legally from 1962. About 400,000 eventually returned to the GDR over time. The policy of the Federal Government maintained a marked "welcoming culture" towards refugees from the GDR.

== Foreign refugees in the Federal Republic of Germany 1949–1990 ==
Based on the experiences of German emigrants, who, on the run from the Nazis, became dependent on a country that had taken them in as refugees, a new article (article 16) was added to the Federal Republic's Basic Law (Grundgesetz) in 1948–49 with the following succinct text: "Politically persecuted persons have the right of asylum." With this, the Federal Republic of Germany is obliged to grant a right of residence to the politically persecuted.

The second legal basis for the asylum policy of the Federal Republic of Germany is the Geneva Convention (officially called the Convention relating to the Status of Refugees) which was adopted in 1951 and came into force in 1954. This sets out globally applicable minimum standards for the treatment of refugees. The group of people are covered by this convention are called "Convention refugees".

On average almost 8,600 asylum applications per year had been made between 1953 and 1979; the average number of applications climbed to more than 70,000 between 1980 and 1990. The main reason for the increase in numbers of asylum seekers was the military coup in Turkey in 1980. It led to an influx of thousands of Turks and especially Kurds fleeing to the Federal Republic of Germany.

In retrospect, a target of criticism was that the Federal Republic of Germany had only two mechanisms for immigration by non-Germans from countries outside the European Union, due to the recruitment of migrant workers in 1973 and the lack of an immigration law: family reunification and the assertion of the basic right to asylum. The "bottleneck" of asylum was very early "pried forcefully from the outside and tightened again and again from the inside in a public defensive struggle, which created the bogeyman of the so-called 'refugee'".

This is the Iron Curtain from the late 1950s up to the late 1980s. Created by Vernes Seferovic.

During the Cold War hundreds of thousands of people fled from the countries of Central and Eastern Europe through the "Iron Curtain" to the west. In particular, after the crushing of the Hungarian Uprising of 1956, the violent termination of the "Prague Spring" in Czechoslovakia in 1968, and the Solidarity (Solidarność) movement in Poland, politically motivated asylum seeking was again a mass phenomenon. The refugees were granted asylum, most notably in the member countries of the NATO Pact, particularly in the Federal Republic of Germany.

Paradoxically, only after the opening of the western borders of the Warsaw Pact states, migrants from these now post-communist states represented the majority of asylum seekers in Germany. In 1986 about 74.8% of the asylum seekers were still coming from the "third world"; but in 1993, 72.1% came from Europe, and especially from eastern, central and south-eastern Europe. At the end of 1978, the Federal Republic of Germany decided to take in South Vietnamese refugees in large numbers. This was preceded by an intensive media coverage of the plight of the so-called "boat people". In order to spare the 40,000 affected Vietnamese, who had been received by the Federal Republic of Germany, from the long procedure of applying for asylum, the category of "humanitarian refugees" was created.

== Refugees taken in from the German Democratic Republic ==
In the years of Germany's division, politically persecuted figures fled from Greece, Chile, Angola, Mozambique, El Salvador and Nicaragua to the GDR. However, there they had very little contact with the German population in everyday life, as they hardly lived with them, being housed instead in special dormitories. Until 1962, the GDR took in over 200 deserters from NATO forces: primarily US soldiers.

== Refugee Policy ==
In the 1990s, following the resolution of the east–west conflict, there were many crises and wars throughout Europe and the world. For example, there was a war in the former Yugoslavia, and a border dispute between Ethiopia and Eritrea, as well as between Mali and Burkina Faso. In Burundi there was a civil war, as well as in the Republic of Congo, Senegal and Zimbabwe. By 1992, the number of refugees had risen to 440,000. As a consequence, there was a wave of arson attacks on the homes of the foreigners (in Hoyerswerda, Rostock-Lichtenhagen, Mölln and Solingen). Voters became more willing to accept extreme-right political parties. As a reaction to this crisis, asylum policy in Germany was established with the introduction into the Grundgesetz of articles tackling this problem. Clause 16a was changed: a person coming from a "safe country of origin" or a "safe third country" can no longer claim political asylum on account of feeling in danger. In 1993, the law to give benefits for asylum seekers was introduced. It stated, amongst other things, that foreigners who from the start have been dependent on government aid, were to receive a lower amount than Germans and any others of equal status. The amount fell by almost 40%, to a smaller amount than the unemployment benefit (Arbeitslosengeld II LINK). In 1997 the Dublin convention was concluded, through which the German refugee policy was secured according to the European Community Law. Since then, in Germany's neighbouring countries, more specifically known as "safe third countries", the expected number of asylum seekers sank steadily, from roughly 320,000 in 1993 to 28,018 in 2008. It was decided that asylum seekers would only have the chance of a favourable decision if they arrive by air. As a part of the "Asylum Compromise", transient asylum seekers, who have landed in Germany and are still within the transit area, will be subject to accelerated asylum procedures. According to the rules, the decision on their application must be made within 2 days; the objection period is only 3 days. This means that the number of cases is kept low, which through the directive "2001/51 / EU, airlines", members of third countries (such as citizens of countries who are not members of the EU) allow entry into an EU country without a valid travel document, must pay a fine. This fine, since 2001, in Europe is as high as between 3,000 and 5,000 euros per passenger travelling illegally.

== Jewish migration since 1990 ==
After 1990, a contingent of Jewish refugees came from the former Soviet Union to Germany, hoping to achieve a more developed quality of life, where the Jewish population at the back of the national socialism regime was to be (almost) repented.

== Yugoslavian War (1991–1999) ==
In the wake of the Yugoslavian war, by 1995, Germany had received 350,000 refugees from the warring states. This figure encompasses 48% of the total number of migrants, that left the former Yugoslavia, who went to Germany. With a few cases of hardship, most of them returned to their homeland in 2003.

== Asylum policy in the refugee crisis ==
As part of the 2015 European migrant crisis more than a million refugees gained asylum in Germany in 2015 and 2016.

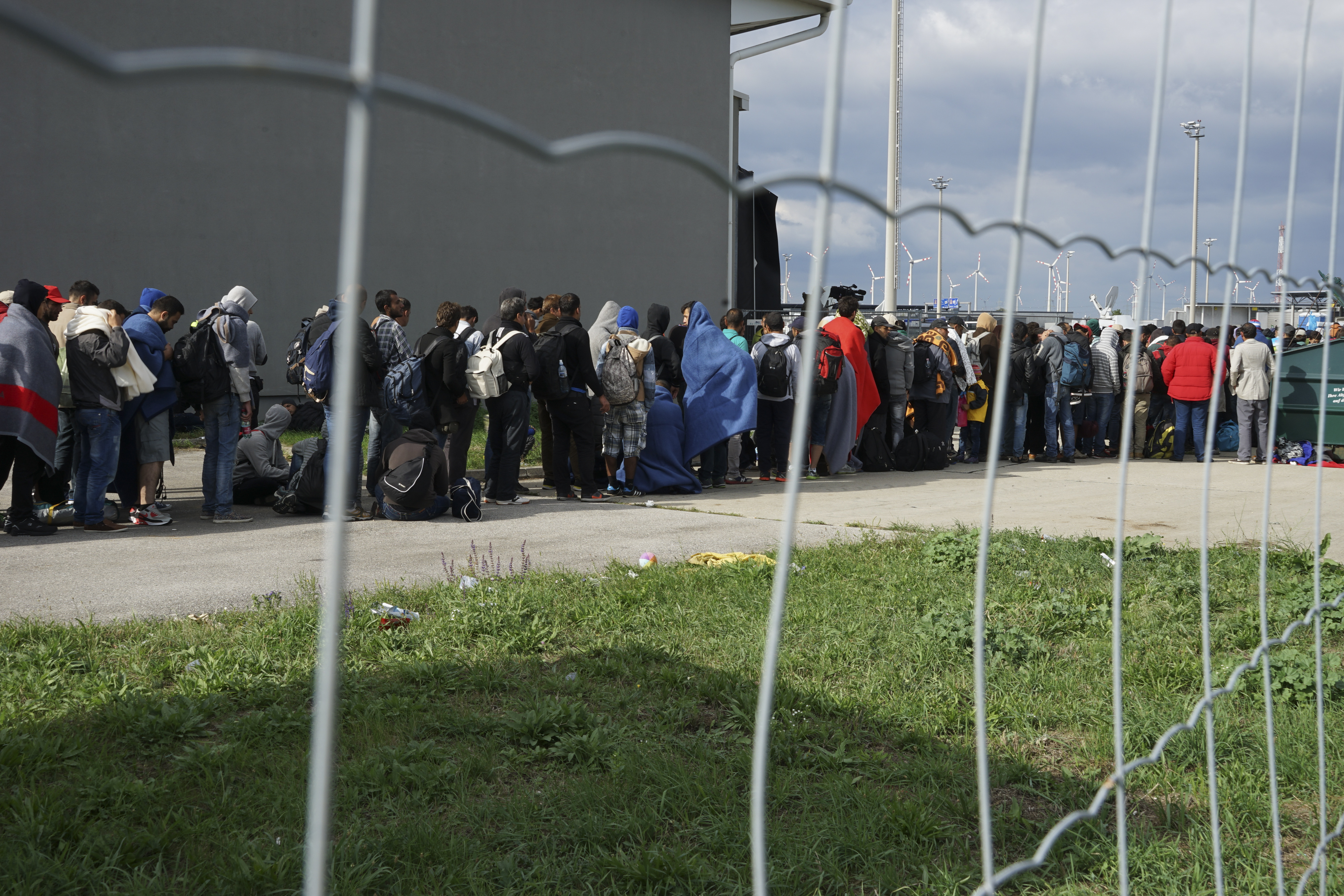
A line of Syrian refugees crossing the border of Hungary and Austria on their way to Germany, 6 September 2015

In September 2015, the authorities found it more and more difficult to house the huge number of refugees and in particular concerned the states' registration facilities (LEA). These were shelters where the refugees were housed after they were picked up from a train station by the federal police. In order to meet the needs at least partly, the responsible regional councils of the states opened provisional shelters in many locations: demand-oriented registration facilities (BEA). The numbers of people living in the LEAs and the BEAs varied daily and they were accommodated in these registration facilities for a maximum of three months. For example, the LEA in Karlsruhe, which had a capacity of 1000, took in 3500 people.

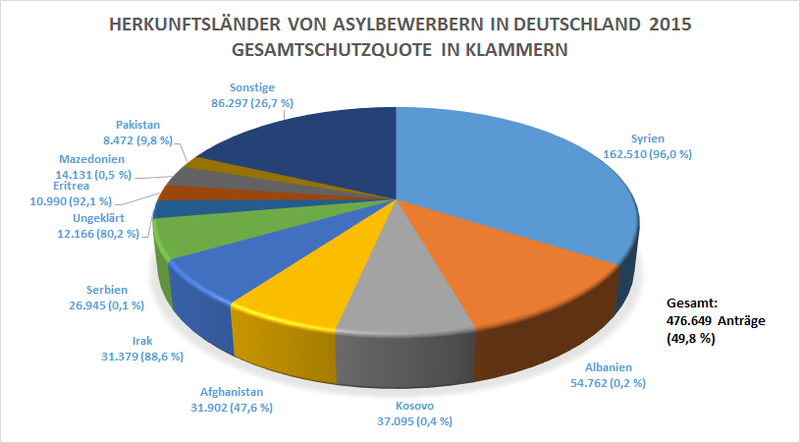
Countries applying for asylum in Germany in 2015

It proved to be difficult to register newcomers quickly, and furthermore to quickly separate the refugees who had to be sheltered because of the Geneva Convention on Refugees, from those migrants who are not legally entitled to stay in Germany. Locating the illegal entrants as well as the fast deportation of those who did not have the right of residence also proved to be difficult. Above all, this situation led to a controversial, nationwide debate over the German refugee policy. On February 17, 2016, shortly before the EU summit in Brussels on February 18–19, the Federal Chancellor said in her government declaration that she would advocate a European-Turkish solution to the refugee crisis. The goal was to "noticeably and sustainably reduce the number of refugees, thus furthermore helping the people, who really need our protection". This goal was to be achieved by controlling the causes of movement, protecting the external borders of the EU, particularly the border between Greece and Turkey, and arranging an organized and controlled inward flow of the refugees. The arrivals on the Austrian-German border have since then been registered and controlled. A consistent refugee identification is being gradually introduced.

In October 2015 a legislative package with essential amendments (Asylpaket I) were passed into law. On 3 February 2016, the federal cabinet decided on a second legislative package with stricter regulations (Asylpaket II). This includes the introduction of particular registration facilities (BAE) for certain refugee groups, provided that their asylum requests are accepted within three weeks, including provision for possible appeal against the decision of BAMF (Federal Office for Migration and Refugees in Germany) in court. The law was due to be enacted by the German government at the end of February.

== European refugee and asylum policy ==
From the outlook of 2008, the Federal Agency for Civic Education divided the history of migration and asylum policy of the European Communities, and later that of the European Union, in three phases:

1. 1957–1990: coordinated policy of the member states
2. 1990–1999: intergovernmental cooperation
3. 1999– (as of 2008): migration policy as a genuine common task

== See also ==
- Immigration and crime in Germany
- Integration of immigrants
