= Nancy Faeser =

German politician, Federal Minister of Interior (born 1970)

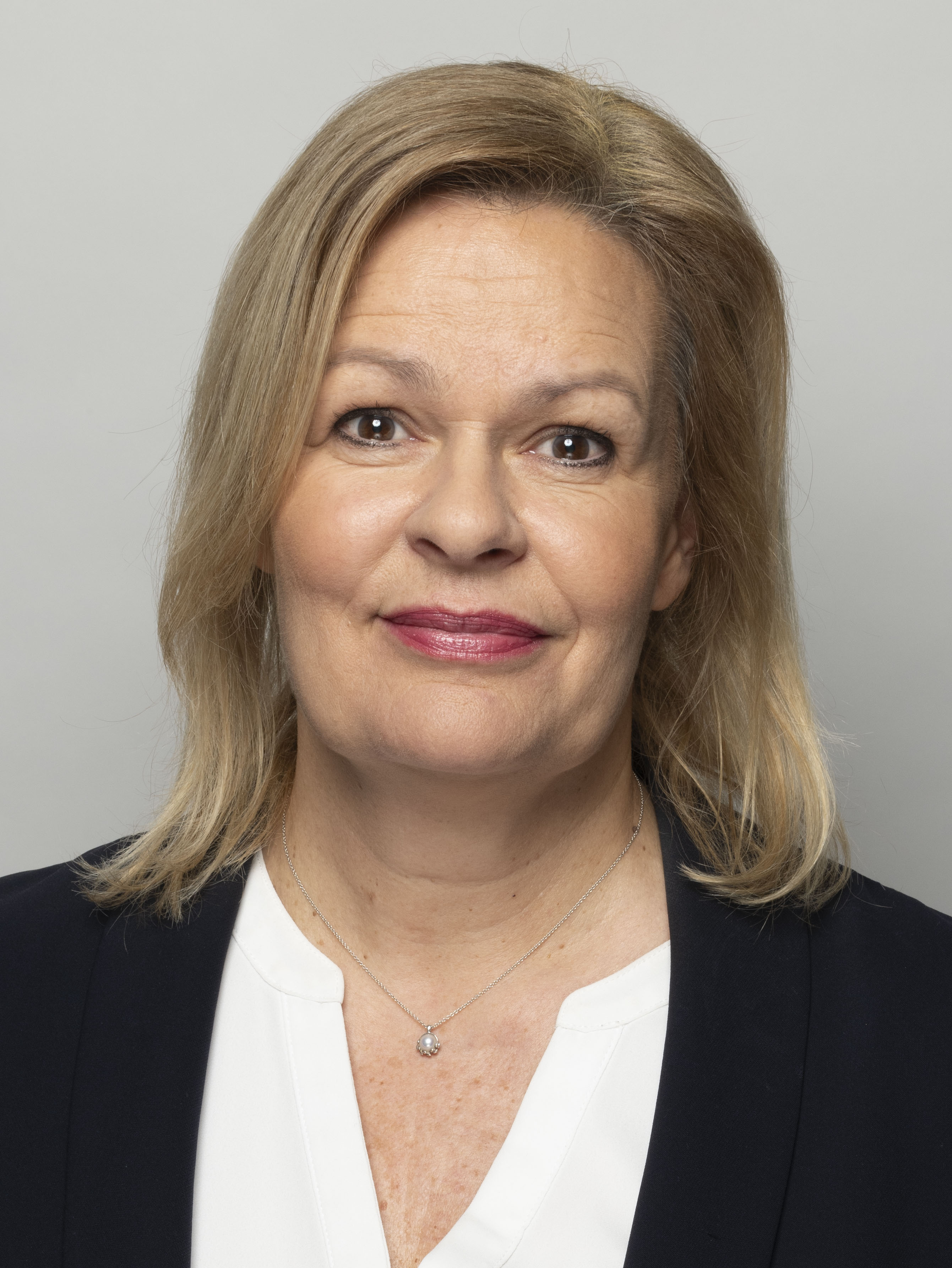
- Official portrait, 2023

Minister for the Interior and Community
- In office 8 December 2021 – 6 May 2025
- Chancellor: Olaf Scholz
- Preceded by: Horst Seehofer (Interior, Building and Community)
- Succeeded by: Alexander Dobrindt

Leader of the Social Democratic Party in Hesse
- In office 1 October 2019 – 9 March 2024
- General Secretary: Christoph Degen
- Deputy: Kirsten Fründt; Timon Gremmels; Kaweh Mansoori
- Preceded by: Thorsten Schäfer-Gümbel
- Succeeded by: Sören Bartol

Leader of the Social Democratic Party in the Landtag of Hesse
- In office 4 September 2019 – 8 December 2021
- Preceded by: Thorsten Schäfer-Gümbel
- Succeeded by: Günter Rudolph

General Secretary of the Social Democratic Party in Hesse
- In office 2014–2019

Member of the Landtag of Hesse
- In office 5 April 2003 – 8 December 2021
- Preceded by: multi-member district
- Succeeded by: Rüdiger Holschuh
- Constituency: Social Democratic Party List

Member of the Bundestag
- Incumbent
- Assumed office March 2025

Personal details
- Born: 13 July 1970 (age 56) Bad Soden, West Germany (now Germany)
- Party: Social Democratic Party
- Spouse: Eyke Grüning (m. 2012)
- Children: 1
- Education: Goethe University Frankfurt
- Occupation: Politician; Academic; Lawyer
- Website: Official website

Nancy Faeser (German pronunciation: [ˈnɛnsi ˈfɛːzɐ]; born 13 July 1970) is a German lawyer and politician of the Social Democratic Party (SPD), served as Federal Minister of the Interior and Community in Chancellor Olaf Scholz's cabinet from 2021 to 2025. She was a member of the State Parliament of Hesse from the 2003 elections until 2021. In 2019, she became the party's leader in Hesse, as well as the leader of the Opposition in the Landtag of Hesse.

== Education and early career ==
Faeser went to elementary school in Schwalbach am Taunus, a suburb of Frankfurt am Main, and passed her Abitur at the Albert-Einstein-Gymnasium.

From 1990 to 2000 Faeser studied law at the Goethe University Frankfurt. She completed a semester abroad at the New College of California and graduated with her second state bar exam as a licensed attorney.

Until 2000, Faeser worked as a research assistant at Clifford Chance in Frankfurt am Main and then, after her bar exam, worked as a full-time lawyer at Clifford Chance from 2000 to 2007.

== Political career ==
=== Career in state politics ===
Faeser joined the SPD in 1988.

In parliament, Faeser served as a member of the Committee on Legal Affairs (2003–2009), the Committee on the Election of Judges (2003–2013), the Committee on Economic Affairs, Energy and Transport (2014–2018) and the Committee on Internal Affairs (since 2009). From 2009, she was her parliamentary group's spokesperson on internal affairs.

In the 2013 Hesse state election, Faeser was the shadow minister for internal affairs in the campaign team of SPD candidate Thorsten Schäfer-Gümbel. In 2019, she was elected her parliamentary group's chairwoman.

On 17 June 2023, Faeser was elected as the top candidate on the party list in the upcoming 2023 Hessian state election, and also stood as the party's direct candidate in the Main-Taunus I electoral district in Frankfurt's northwestern suburbs, which includes her hometown of Schwalbach am Taunus. However, she won only 14.8% of the direct vote in the district, coming third after CDU (43.9%) and the Greens (16.1%). She was elected on the party list, but all three federal government parties (SPD, the Greens and FDP) suffered losses in the election, with SPD winning only 15% of the vote in its worst performance in the state history and coming third after CDU (34.6%) and AfD (18.4%). The loss can be attributed to discontent with Scholz's government, of which she is a minister. In March 2025, Faeser became member of the Bundestag for Hesse.

=== Minister of the Interior, 2021–2025 ===
In the negotiations to form a so-called traffic light coalition of the SPD, the Green Party and the Free Democrats (FDP) following the 2021 German elections, Faeser was part of her party's delegation in the working group on migration and integration, co-chaired by Boris Pistorius, Luise Amtsberg and Joachim Stamp.

After the coalition was successfully formed, on 6 December 2021, it was announced that Faeser would become the first female Interior Minister of Germany in the German government in the Scholz cabinet. In her capacity as minister, Faeser also takes part in the meetings of the Standing Conference of Interior Ministers and Senators of the States (IMK).

Faeser was nominated by her party as delegate to the Federal Convention for the purpose of electing the President of Germany in 2022.

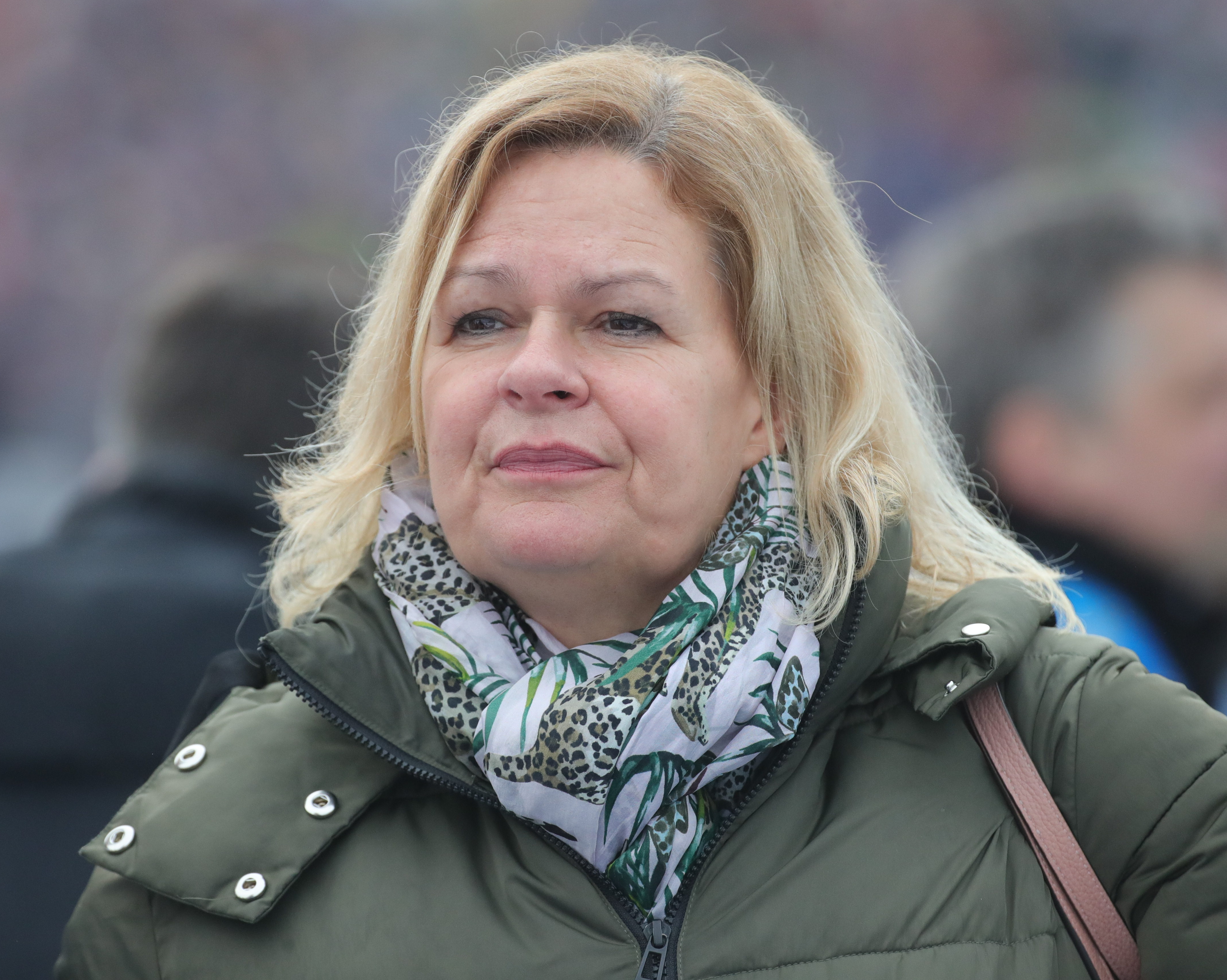
Faeser in 2023

In September 2022, the Ministry of the Interior under Faeser closed the "Expert Group on Political Islamism" set up by her predecessor, Horst Seehofer.

Prior to the 2022 FIFA World Cup in Qatar, when asked in an interview with ARD's Monitor about the awarding of the event to the country, she emphasised that awarding major sporting events should be linked to compliance with human rights and principles of sustainability, by saying: "There are criteria that must be adhered to and it would be better that tournaments are not awarded to such states." In response, the Gulf Cooperation Council condemned the remarks, and Qatar summoned the German ambassador to protest against her comments. Faeser attended Germany's first game at the World Cup on 23 November where she wore a OneLove armband (a pro LGBTQ+ symbol) which FIFA had prevented players from wearing in the tournament with threats of sanctions.

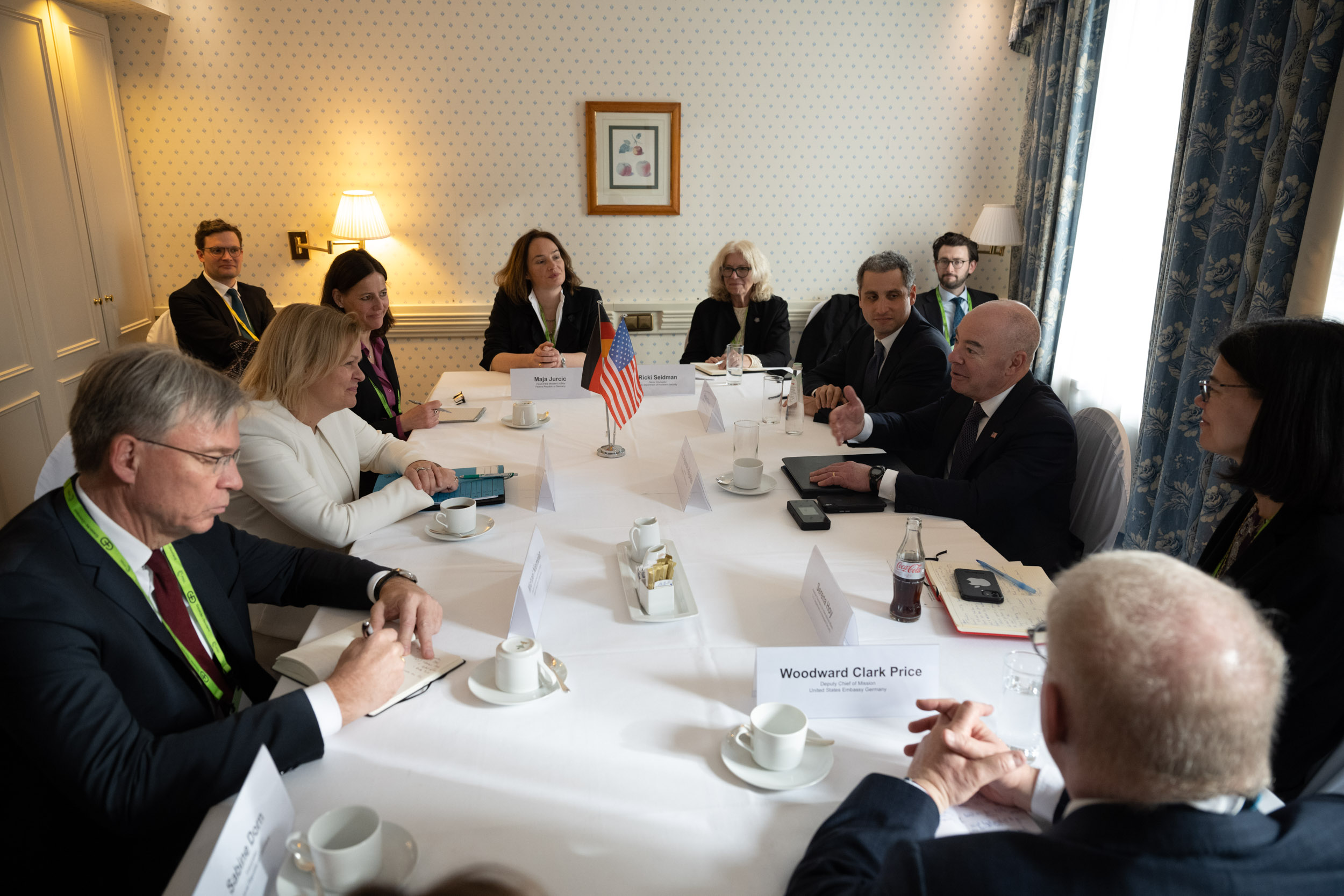
Faeser with Homeland Security Secretary Alejandro Mayorkas in Munich, Germany, 18 February 2023

In March 2023, Faeser participated in the first joint cabinet meeting of the governments of Germany and Japan in Tokyo, chaired by Chancellor Scholz and Prime Minister Fumio Kishida.

In April 2023, Faeser appointed an eight-person commission to re-appraise the attack on Israeli athletes and team members at the 1972 Summer Olympics to answer unresolved questions.

After the outbreak of the Gaza war, Faeser passed laws criminalizing alleged Hamas slogans, including "from the river to the sea". Liz Fekete criticized Faeser's interpretation that the slogan was uniquely linked to Hamas. Such a reading, according to Fekete, can be seen as "silencing Palestinians and smearing their aspirations".

In June 2024, Faeser presented the 2023 Federal Council for the Protection of the Constitution report, which for the first time classified the Boycott, Divestment and Sanctions (BDS) movement as a "suspected case" of extremism. This action marks a significant, formal step by the ministry in assessing the group's activities.

In July 2024 Faeser imposed a ban on the magazine Compact arguing that it worked against constitutional order. The editor-in-chief Jürgen Elsässer described the decision as "the worst invasion of press freedom in Germany." The ban was later reversed by the Federal Administrative Court.

On 2 May 2025, days before the Merz cabinet took office, Faeser was responsible for quoting from a report by the Federal Office for the Protection of the Constitution which apparently classified the political party Alternative for Germany (AfD) as a confirmed right-wing extremist endeavor. The report itself was kept secret, but later leaked to various media outlets. Faeser was criticized for her verdict, since the report did not contain compelling evidence, but was merely a collection of already publicly available quotes by AfD members. Chancellor Friedrich Merz criticized Faeser for the timing of her announcement and the fact, that her office had not checked the report before going public.

Immigration

In her first year in office, Faeser extended border checks at crossings from Austria for six months after a rise in the number of migrants arriving via the Western Balkans route.

Following Faeser's propospal, Germany's coalition government listed Georgia and Moldova as safe countries of origin in August 2023, in an effort to process asylum applications from those countries more quickly and lead to faster deportations for failed applicants.

In September 2023, more than 120 boats carrying around 7,000 migrants from Africa arrived on the Italian island of Lampedusa within 24 hours. Faeser said that "in view of the massive influx of migrants to Lampedusa, Berlin wants to once again, voluntarily, accept migrants from Italy, which was recently halted."

== Other activities ==
- German Foundation for Active Citizenship and Volunteering (DSEE), Ex-Officio Member of the Board of Trustees (since 2022)
- Business Forum of the Social Democratic Party of Germany, Member of the Political Advisory Board (since 2022)
- Max Planck Institute for the Study of Crime, Security and Law, Member of the Board of Trustees
- EBS Law School, Member of the Board of Trustees
- Hessischer Rundfunk, Member of the Broadcasting Council

== Personal life ==
Faeser's father Horst (1942–2003) was the mayor of her hometown of Schwalbach am Taunus from 1988 to 2002.

Faeser has been married to lawyer Eyke Grüning since 2012. The couple have a son and live in Schwalbach am Taunus.
