= Christine Jackob-Marks =

German painter

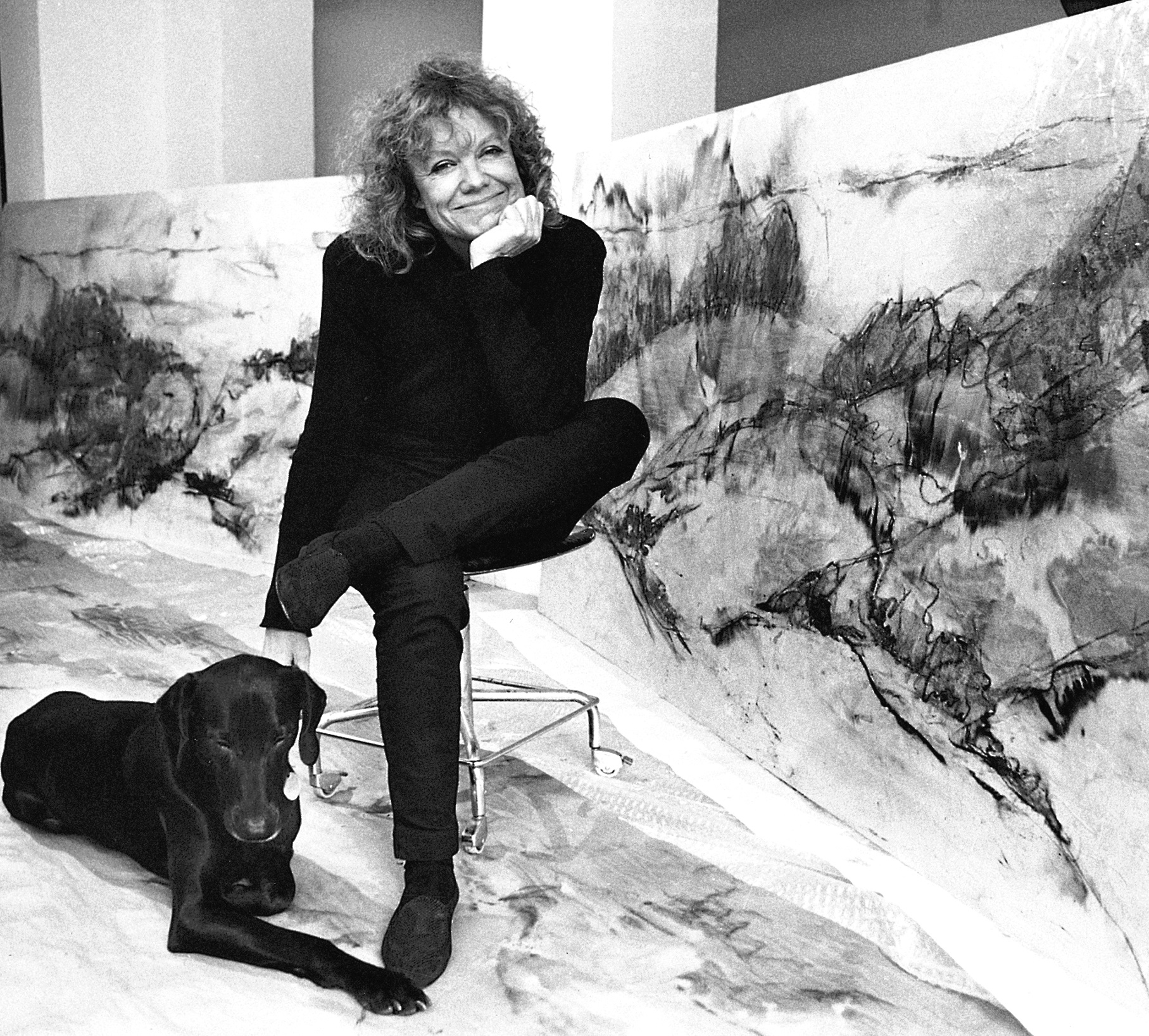
Christine Jackob-Marks

Christine Jackob-Marks (born 1938 in Mainz) is a contemporary German painter of subtle abstraction in mostly serial works and is classified as an informal artist. Christine Jackob-Marks became known to the general public when, in the mid-1990s, her award-winning design for the Memorial to the Murdered Jews of Europe was not implemented due to the veto by Chancellor Helmut Kohl.

== Biography ==
At the age of 17, Christine Jackob moved to London and applied to the Royal Academy of Dramatic Art. After the audition, she was narrowly turned down, with the kind hint of her young age to try again next year. But since Jackob was interested in the fine arts as well as acting, she visited the London museums. In the National Gallery, in front of Renoir’s painting Les Parapluies (the umbrellas), she decided to pursue painting and applied to the Académie de la Grande Chaumière in Paris. In the class of the French painter Ives Breyer, the first pictures were made from models.

Christine Jackob then moved to the Berlin University of the Arts and studied fine arts in the painting classes of Professors Hartmann, Jaenisch and Jansen. In the early 1960s, she married the architect Volker Theissen and they had two children: Jessica and Felix Theissen. The family moved from Berlin-Moabit to an old villa in Nikolassee. The house, formerly also inhabited by Claus Schenk Graf von Stauffenberg, was often used as an original motif for film sequences about the preparations for the 20 July plot, but initially, the couple rented the upper floor to the DAAD Artists-in-Berlin Program. This is how they met artists such as Lawrence Weiner, Franz Gertsch and Roman Opalka. Christine Jackob was fascinated by Gertsch's photorealism, as by the paintings of Markus Lüpertz, from whom her husband bought several works.

At the same time, Jackob dealt with the social challenges in post-war Germany and "how to change society". Painting did not seem to give her a satisfactory answer to such complexes of questions: The change in society had to happen "from below", especially through engaged work with children. In addition to her work in the Berlin design studio, Christine Jackob studied educational science and worked as a therapist for children with behavioral problems and their parents. During this time she also met Marina, a toddler whom she and her second husband, the American pianist Alan D. Marks, adopted.

== Artistic development ==
The art scene, to which Gerhard Richter, Otto Piene, Emil Schumacher and Anselm Kiefer belonged, and also the inspiration that Christine Jackob-Marks received from the work of Paul Cézanne and Gustave Courbet, for example, and from the extensive 1982 Zeitgeist exhibition in Martin-Gropius-Bau, motivated Jackob-Marks to express her personal perception of the present with her own works.

The first exhibitions follow starting in 1984, mainly with still lifes, including animals; but there were also tombstone paintings with Hebrew inscriptions: "Their souls remain among us". Since the painter was now married to Alan D. Marks, an American concert pianist with Jewish roots, the artistic examination of the crimes of National Socialism became an increasingly important topic for Jackob-Marks. As part of the discussion about a German Shoah memorial, Christine Jackob-Marks sharpened her reflections artistically and took part in the 1994 competition.

The jury around Walter Jens awarded her the first prize in the artistic competition for the Memorial to the Murdered Jews of Europe together with Hella Rolfes, Hans Scheib and Reinhard Stangl. But voices were raised that rejected the decision, and due to the intervention of the incumbent Chancellor Helmut Kohl, their design was not built. This started a year-long reorientation with discussions on the location of the monument in Berlin, on the groups of victims of the Nazi dictatorship honored with it, and on the importance of memorials in the 20th and 21st century. In his book Tacheles—In the Struggle for Facts in History and Politics, published in 2020 by Herder Verlag, Michael Wolffsohn describes the central background in the chapter Art as Politics: The Berlin Holocaust Memorial; and Michael S. Cullen put it: "Winning a competition fairly is ideal. Losing a competition by fair means is perhaps not ideal, but no less honorable." Christine Jackob-Marks turned to painting again and worked on new pictures; often to music and often to the Schubert interpretations of her deceased husband: She made drawings with Indian ink and charcoal, in addition there were strong color changes in mixed media of landscapes, of layers of earth: edges of the open-pit coal mines of the Lusatia region, the wild sea, to cosmic black holes, to spiral nebulae from distant suns and back again to earthly nature with its creatures. Manfred Eichel describes her works as sliding into abstractions, as landscapes of the soul: as "pictures in which something actually happens, which are not satisfied with depicting what is available more or less exactly. There is something deeply theatrical about her (Christine Jackob-Marks) interpretations of nature. Her forests blaze, flooded with light, as if they were on fire ... "; the former head of the ZDF feature editorial team for literature and art adds: "What makes your horses comparable to your dogs and elephants is the treatment of the eyes. They literally suck in the viewers. It's strange when you look at her monkeys."

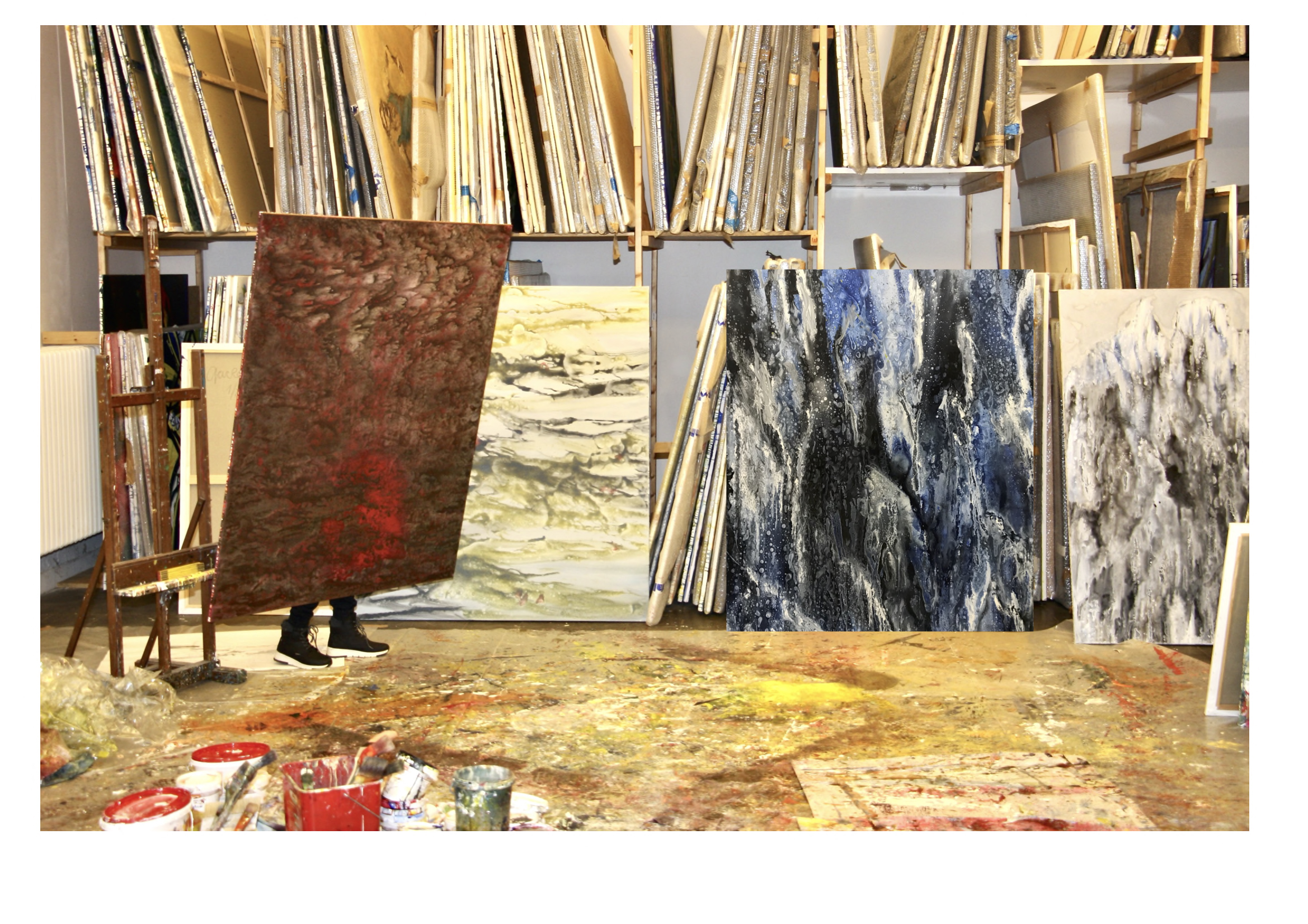
Christine Jackob-Marks in her studio (2023)

From the mid-2000s, Jackob-Marks moved away from figurative motifs and developed her core themes: Landscape, animals and nature to non-figurative pictorial worlds. In the lecture Breathing and Painting, on the occasion of the exhibition "SOIL" in Berlin 2023, the art historian Mark Gisbourne described her paintings as significant works of Informal Painting of German provenance, in which "the actual painting process precedes the meaningful definition of a theme in her work. It would therefore be wrong to see Christine Jackob-Marks as a compositional painter, as if there were a predetermined design that is subsequently executed or painted. She is a painter oriented towards the painting process, and her pictures are primarily created in the act of painting itself." In the dialogue exhibition Cosmos Otto Pine – Christine Jackob-Marks, the Samuelis Baumgarte Galerie presented 20 works by each of the two artists. Kerstin Sewoester wrote in the culture section of the Westfalen-Blatt on November 22, 2025: “The eruptive force of the Big Bang meets the floating power of flowing elements. Humans seem to play no role in the works of both artists. But far from it, for they are part of the greater whole, a piece of the puzzle in the cosmos.” The Bielefeld local section continues: “In the encounter between the two bodies of work (…) a tension arises that (…) spans from Pines’ physical energy to Jackob-Mark’s contemplative depth. (…) Both artists sought the invisible in the medium of painting – that inner radiance that connects all being.”

Christine Jackob-Marks has been a lecturer at the HdK (Berlin University of the Arts) and at the Thuringian Summer Academy. Her work has been exhibited nationally and internationally since 1988: in Germany at the gallery at Savignyplatz, from 1995 in the Gallery Poll, 1996 on the ZDF in Mainz, several times in the Hamburg gallery Rose, in Bielefeld in the Samuelis Baumgarte gallery, in the gallery in the Körnerpark, Berlin and until 2018 in the DNA Gallery; 2020 also from the Berlin Gallery Kewenig in Palma de Mallorca, 2026 at Art Cologne, Palma de Mallorca, presented by Samuelis Baumgarte gallery under the theme: Mediterranean light between form, dream, and perception.

Christine Jackob-Marks lives and works in Berlin and on Ibiza.

== Exhibitions (selected) ==
=== Solo ===
- 2026 Galerie feinart, Berlin Millesfleur
- 2025–2026 Samuelis Baumgarte Galerie, Bielefeld (with Otto Piene) Cosmos
- 2025 Art gallery sans titre, Potsdam Cosmos
- 2024 Galerie Hilde Leiss, Hamburg Temporary landscape impressions
- 2023 Galerie feinart, Berlin Soil
- 2021 Galerie Mutare, Berlin Christine Jackob-Marks
- 2021 Werkbund, Berlin, All is in flux
- 2020 Gallery Kewenig, Palma de Mallorca (Spain) Easy in difficulty
- 2018 DNA Gallery, Berlin Happy Birthday
- 2016 DNA gallery, retrospective
- 2014 Gallery in the Körnerpark Let there be light!
- 2012 Gallery in the Körnerpark, landscape views
- 2012 Galerie Cornelissen, Wiesbaden, Moments
- 2010 Gallery in the Körnerpark, Animals
- 2009 Galerie Eva Poll, Berlin, Animals
- 2008 Bauscher Gallery, Potsdam Painting – Drawings
- 2008 First Sound Gallery (798 district) (with Dieter Finke), Beijing (China)
- 2006 Arte plus Arte, Casa Colonial, Ibiza (Spain)
- 2005 Art Academy Galerie Döbele, Dresden Structures, rifts and patterns
- 2004 Wall AG headquarters, Berlin, Everything in flux
- 2004 Gallery in the media house GIMM, Mainz
- 2002 Rose Gallery, Hamburg Summer 2002
- 2001 Samuelis Baumgarte Gallery, Bielefeld
- 2000 Galerie Eva Poll, Berlin, Earth transformations
- 1999 SESA AG in cooperation with Galerie Eva Poll, Berlin
- 1999 Bauscher Gallery, Potsdam, Between heaven and earth
- 1998 Galerie Libro Azul, Art Ibiza Fair, Ibiza (Spain)
- 1996 Samuelis Baumgarte Gallery, Bielefeld: Pictures and drawings
- 1996 ZDF Mainz
- 1996 Bauscher Gallery, Potsdam, Landscape and Visions
- 1995 Garden-Park-Landscape, Berlin
- 1995 Galerie Mutter Fourage
- 1995 Rose Gallery, Hamburg
- 1995 Eva Poll Gallery, Berlin
- 1994 Art & Concept Gallery, Munich
- 1993 Rose Gallery, Hamburg
- 1991 Galerie Rose, Hamburg (with Reinhard Stangl)
- 1991 Kunstverein Schering, Berlin
- 1988 Center Artistique International, St. Etienne (France)
- 1988 Gallery at Savignyplatz, Berlin

=== Group ===
- 2026 Art Cologne Palma de Mallorca (Spanien), Samuelis Baumgarte Galerie, Bielefeld
- 2026 Art Karlsruhe, Samuelis Baumgarte Galerie, Bielefeld
- 2025 Affordable Art Fair Hamburg, Gallery fine art, Berlin
- 2024 Der Schöne 27. April, Galerie Stangl und Freunde, Berlin
- 2024 Undercover Showroom, Galerie Mutare, Berlin
- 2021 Classically Modern. Historical and contemporary works by female artists, Salongalerie Die Möwe, Berlin
- 2015–2018 DNA Galerie, Berlin
- 2015 Galerie Cornelissen, Wiesbaden
- 2012 Art Academy, Zürich Erlenbach
- 2009 Hoher Dom zu Mainz, Kunstverein Eisenturm, Mainz
- 2005 Bilderleben Katholisches Stadthaus, Wuppertal
- 2003 15 Jahre Galerie Bauscher, Potsdam
- 2001 Erde Feuer Wasser Luft Galerie Bauscher, Potsdam
- 1995–1997 Art Cologne Galerie Eva Poll, Berlin
- 1995 Memorial to the Murdered Jews of Europe, Competition entry together with Hella Rolfes, Hans Scheib and Reinhard Stangl (won)
- 1995 Art auction for Otto Dix, Neue Nationalgalerie, Berlin
- 1989 Galerie Rose, Hamburg
- 1987–1991 Freie Berliner Kunstausstellung

== Awards (selected) ==
- 1995 First prize in the artistic competition Memorial to the Murdered Jews of Europe together with Hella Rolfes, Hans Scheib and Reinhard Stangl

== Collections (selected) ==
- Kupferstichkabinett Berlin
- Berlinische Galerie
- Werkbundarchiv – Museum der Dinge, Berlin
- Various privat collections

== Literature (selected) ==
- Cosmos: Christine Jackob-Marks – Otto Piene, dual catalog, 90 pages, text: Alexander Baumgarte, photos: Thomas Starke, edition: Samuelis Baumgarte gallery, Bielefeld 2025, ISBN 978-3-948504-13-7 (german)
- In der Schwere leicht: 2017–2019, Gallery Kewenig, Ausstellungskatalog, 32 Seiten, Text: Manfred Eichel, Mallorca 2020.
- Ulf Meyer zu Kueingdorf (Hrsg.): Christine Jackob-Marks. Es muss im Leben mehr als alles geben. (German, English) Kerber Verlag, Bielefeld/Berlin 2016, ISBN 978-3-7356-0225-1
- Christine Jackob-Marks: Tiere und Landschaften: 2006–2008, Katalog, Texte: Manfred Eichel, Christina Wendenburg, Siebenhaar Verlag 2009, ISBN 978-3-936962-76-5.
- Christine Jackob-Marks und Dieter Finke: 2008, Katalog, 64 Seiten, Text: Christina Wendenburg, Fotos: u. a. Bernd Kuhnert, China 2008.
- Christine Jackob-Marks: 2003–2005, Katalog, 64 Seiten, Text: Peter Herbstreuth, Fotos: Bernd Kuhnert, Berlin 2005.
- Christine Jackob-Marks: Erdwandlungen 2000–2002, Katalog als Schuber, 39 Seiten, Text: Stefan Franz Mayer, Fotos: Bernd Kuhnert, Berlin 2002.
- Christine Jackob-Marks: 1998–1999, Katalog, 64 Seiten, Text: Viktoria von Flemming, Fotos: Bernd Kuhnert, Berlin 1999.
- Christine Jackob-Marks: 1996–1997, Katalog, 64 Seiten, Text: Jacqueline Frowein, Fotos: Bernd Kuhnert, Berlin 1997.
- Christine Jackob-Marks: Bilder und Zeichnungen, Ausstellungskatalog, 10 Abbildungen mit Auszügen der Rede des ZDF-Intendanten Dieter Stolte zur Ausstellung von Christine Jackob-Marks im Sendezentrum Mainz, Fotos: Bernd Kuhnert, 1996.
- Christine Jackob Marks: 1991–1995, vier Kataloge im Schuber, Texte: Peter Raue, Hermann Wiesler, Friedrich Rohde, Fotos: Bernd Kuhnert, 1995.
