= Memorial to the Murdered Jews of Europe =

Memorial in Berlin, Germany

- Denkmal für die ermordeten Juden Europas
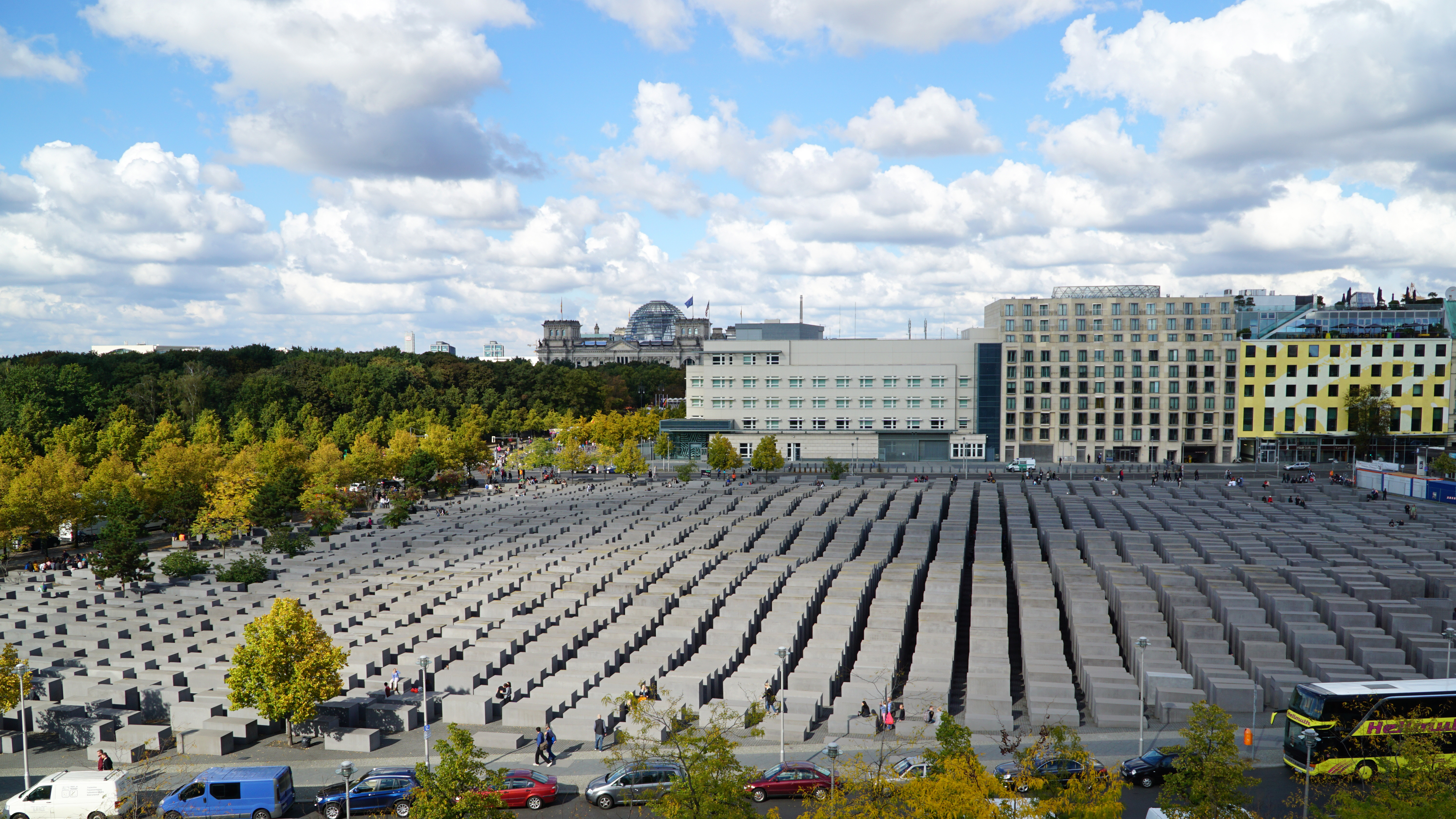
- General view of the Memorial from the South
- Interactive map of Memorial to the Murdered Jews of Europe
- Location: Berlin, Germany
- Coordinates: 52°30′50″N 13°22′43″E
- Designer: Peter Eisenman
- Material: Concrete
- Beginning date: 1 April 2003
- Completion date: 15 December 2004
- Dedicated date: 10 May 2005
- Dedicated to: Jewish victims of the Holocaust
- Website: stiftung-denkmal.de

The Memorial to the Murdered Jews of Europe (German: Denkmal für die ermordeten Juden Europas), also known as the Holocaust Memorial (German: Holocaust-Mahnmal), is a memorial in Berlin to the Jewish victims of the Holocaust committed by Nazi Germany, designed by architect Peter Eisenman and Buro Happold. It consists of a 1.9-hectare (4.7-acre) site covered with 2,711 concrete slabs or "stelae", arranged in a grid pattern on a sloping field. The original plan was to place nearly 4,000 slabs, but after the recalculation, the number of slabs that could legally fit into the designated areas was 2,711. The stelae are 2.38 m (7 ft 9 1/2 in) long, 0.95 m (3 ft 1 1/2 in) wide and vary in height from 0.2 to 4.7 metres (8 in to 15 ft 5 in). They are organized in rows, 54 of them going north–south, and 87 heading east–west at right angles but set slightly askew. An attached underground "Place of Information" (German: Ort der Information) holds the names of approximately 3 million Jewish Holocaust victims, obtained from the Israeli museum Yad Vashem.

Building began on 1 April 2003, and was finished on 15 December 2004. It was inaugurated on 10 May 2005, 60 years after the end of World War II in Europe, and opened to the public two days later. It is located one block south of the Brandenburg Gate, in the Mitte neighbourhood. The cost of construction was approximately €25 million.

== Location ==
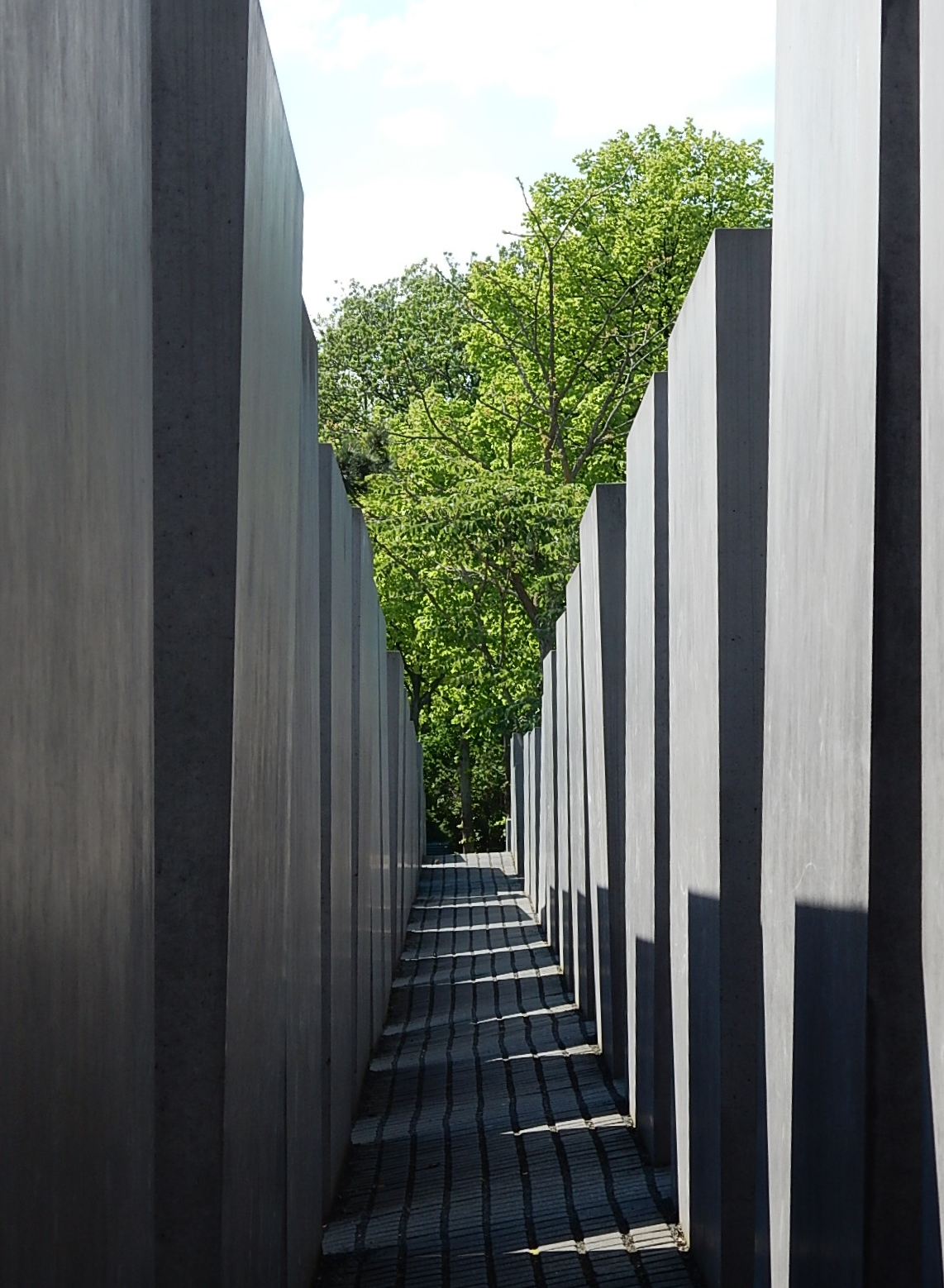
View between the stelae

The memorial is located on Cora-Berliner-Straße 1, 10117 in Berlin, a city with one of the largest Jewish populations in Europe before the Second World War. Adjacent east to the Tiergarten, it is centrally located in Berlin's historical Friedrichstadt district, close to the Reichstag building and the Brandenburg Gate. The monument is situated on the former location of the Berlin Wall, where the "death strip" once divided the city. During the Third Reich a part of this area was the location of Joseph Goebbels' urban villa, with the nearby Reich Chancellery and the Führerbunker in the south. The memorial is located near many of Berlin's foreign embassies.

The monument is composed of 2,711 rectangular concrete blocks, laid out in a rectangular grid covering 1.9 hectares (4 acres 3 roods). This allows for long, straight, and narrow alleys between them, along which the ground undulates.

== History ==
=== Beginnings ===
The debates over the existence and form of such a memorial extend back to the late 1980s, when a small group of private West German citizens, led by television journalist Lea Rosh and historian Eberhard Jäckel, first began pressing for West Germany to honor the six million Jews murdered in the Holocaust. Rosh soon emerged as the driving force behind the memorial. In 1989, she founded a group to support its construction and to collect donations. With growing support, the Bundestag (the German federal parliament) passed a resolution in favour of the project. On 25 June 1999, the Bundestag decided to build the memorial designed by Peter Eisenman. A federal foundation (Foundation for the Memorial to the Murdered Jews of Europe (German: Stiftung Denkmal für die ermordeten Juden Europas) was consequently founded to run it.

=== First competition ===
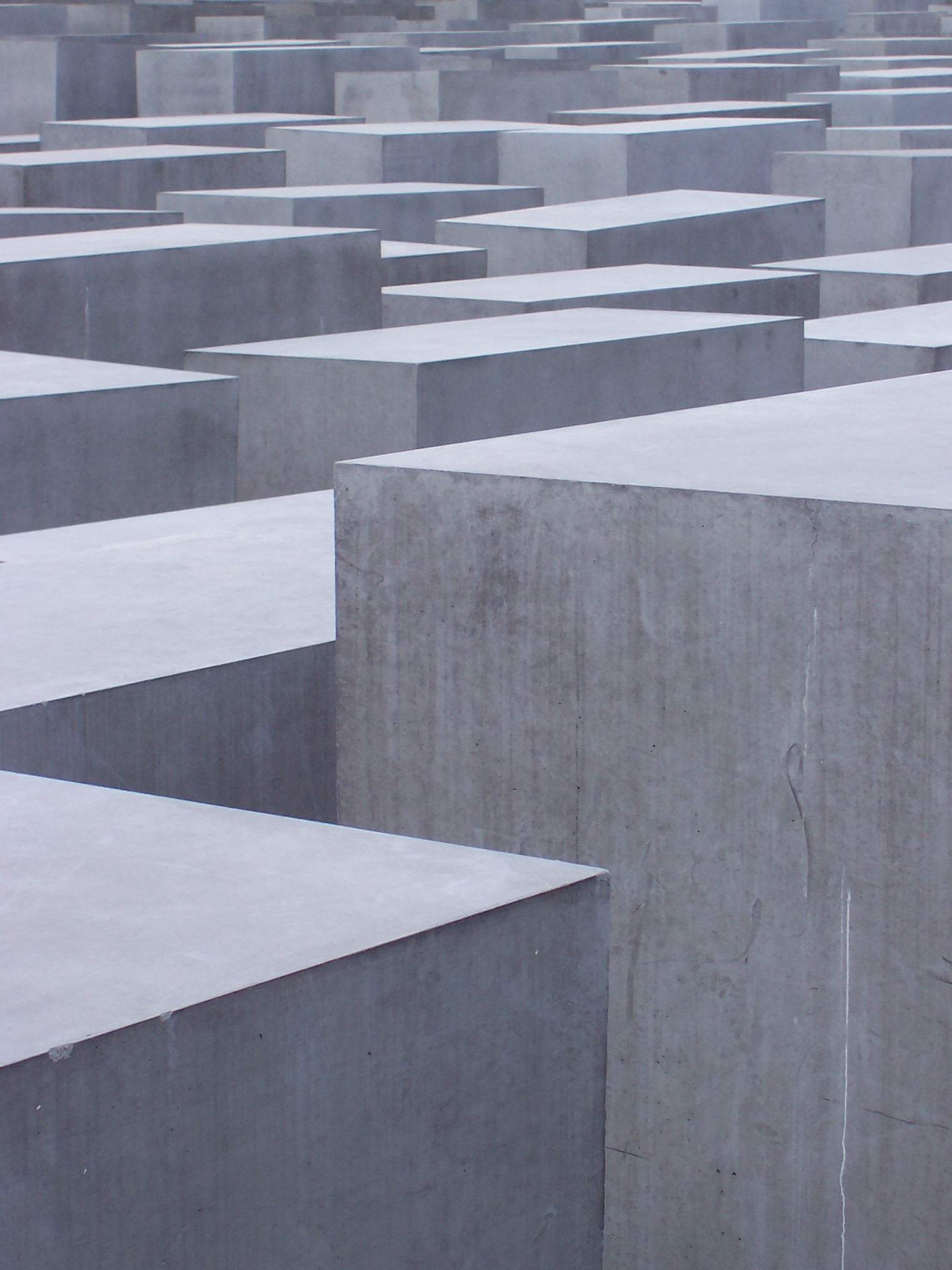
The Memorial

In April 1994 a competition for the memorial's design was announced in Germany's major newspapers. Twelve artists were specifically invited to submit a design and given 50,000 DM (€25,000) to do so. The winning proposal was to be selected by a jury consisting of representatives from the fields of art, architecture, urban design, history, politics and administration, including Frank Schirrmacher, co-editor of the Frankfurter Allgemeine Zeitung. The deadline for the proposals was 28 October. On 11 May, an information colloquium took place in Berlin, where people interested in submitting a design could receive some more information about the nature of the memorial to be designed. Ignatz Bubis, the president of the Central Council of Jews in Germany, and Wolfgang Nagel, the construction senator of Berlin, spoke at the event.

Before the deadline, the documents required to submit a proposal were requested over 2,600 times and 528 proposals were submitted. The jury met on 15 January 1995 to pick the best submission. First, Walter Jens, the president of the Akademie der Künste, was elected chairman of the jury. In the following days, all but 13 submissions were eliminated from the race in several rounds of looking through all works. As had already been arranged, the jury met again on 15 March. Eleven submissions were restored to the race, as requested by several jurors after they had had a chance to review the eliminated works in the months in between the meetings.

Two works were then recommended by the jury to the foundation to be checked as to whether they could be completed within the price range given. One of them was designed by a group around the architect Simon Ungers from Hamburg; it consisted of 85×85 meters square of steel girders on top of concrete blocks located on the corners. The names of several extermination camps would be perforated into the girders so that these would be projected onto objects or people in the area by sunlight. The other winner was a design by Christine Jackob-Marks. Her concept consisted of 100×100 meters large concrete plate, seven meters thick. It would be tilted, rising up to eleven meters and walkable on special paths. The names of the Jewish victims of the Holocaust would be engraved into the concrete, with spaces left empty for those victims whose names remain unknown. Large pieces of debris from Masada, a mountaintop-fortress in Israel, whose Jewish inhabitants killed themselves to avoid being captured or killed by the Roman soldiers rushing in, would be spread over the concrete plate. Other ideas involved a memorial not only to the Jews but to all the victims of Nazism.

Federal Chancellor Helmut Kohl, who had taken a close personal interest in the project, expressed his dissatisfaction with the recommendations of the jury to implement the work of the Jackob-Marks team. A new, more limited competition was launched in 1996 with 25 architects and sculptors invited to submit proposals.

== Eisenman design ==
The date for the inauguration was scrapped and in 1997 the first of three public discussions on the monument was held. The second competition in November 1997 produced four finalists, including a collaboration between architect Peter Eisenman and artist Richard Serra whose plan later emerged as the winner. Their design originally envisaged a huge labyrinth of 4,000 stone pillars of varying heights scattered over 17,000 square metres (180,000 sq ft). Serra, however, quit the design team soon after, citing personal and professional reasons that "had nothing to do with the merits of the project." Kohl still insisted on numerous changes, but Eisenman soon indicated he could accommodate them. Among other changes, the initial Eisenman-Serra project was soon scaled down to a monument of some 2,000 pillars.

By 1999, as other empty stretches of land nearby were filled with new buildings, the two-hectare (five-acre) vacant lot began to resemble a hole in the city's centre.

In a breakthrough mediated by W. Michael Blumenthal and negotiated between Eisenman and Michael Naumann in January 1999, the essence of the huge field of stone pillars – to which the incoming German government led by Gerhard Schröder had earlier objected – was preserved. The number of pillars was reduced from about 2,800 to somewhere between 1,800 and 2,100, and a building to be called The House of Remembrance – consisting of an atrium and three sandstone blocks – was to be added. This building – an archive, information centre and exhibition space – was to be flanked by a thick, 90-metre-long (100 yd) Wall of Books that would have housed a million books between an exterior made of patterned black steel and a glass interior side. The Wall of Books, containing works that scholars would have been able to consult, was intended to symbolize the concern of the Schröder government that the memorial not be merely backward-looking and symbolic but also educational and useful. Agreement was also reached that the memorial would be administered by the Jewish Museum.

On 25 June 1999, a majority of the Bundestag – 314 to 209, with 14 abstentions – decided in favour of Eisenman's plan, which was eventually modified by attaching a museum, or "place of information," designed by Berlin-based exhibition designer Dagmar von Wilcken. Across the street from the northern boundary of the memorial is the new Embassy of the United States in Berlin, which opened 4 July 2008. For a while, issues over setback for US embassy construction impacted the memorial. It also emerged in late 1999 that a small corner of the site was still owned by a municipal housing company, and the status of that piece of land had to be resolved before any progress on the construction could be made.

In July 2001, the provocative slogan The Holocaust never happened appeared in newspaper advertisements and on billboards seeking donations of $2 million for the memorial. Under the slogan and a picture of a serene mountain lake and snow-capped mountain, a smaller type said: "There are still many people who make this claim. In 20 years there could be even more."

== Construction ==
On 27 January 2000 a celebration was held marking the symbolic beginning of construction on the memorial site. The first provisional stelae were erected in May 2001. An international symposium on the memorial and the information centre was held by the foundation in November 2001 together with historians, museum experts, art historians and experts on architectural theory. In the spring of 2003, work began on the construction of the memorial. At the same time, an information point was erected at the fence surrounding the construction site.

On 14 October 2003, the Swiss newspaper Tages-Anzeiger published articles noting that the Degussa company was involved in the construction of the memorial, producing the anti-graffiti substance Protectosil used to cover the stelae; the company had been involved in various ways in the Nazi persecution of the Jews. A subsidiary company of Degussa, Degesch, had even produced the Zyklon B used to poison people in the gas chambers. At first, these articles did not receive much attention, until the board of trustees managing the construction discussed this situation on 23 October and, after turbulent and controversial discussions, decided to stop construction immediately until a decision was made. Primarily it was representatives of the Jewish community who had called for an end to Degussa's involvement, while the politicians on the board, including Wolfgang Thierse, did not want to stop construction and incur further expense. They also said it would be impossible to exclude all German companies involved in the Nazi crimes, because – as Thierse put it – "the past intrudes into our society". Lea Rosh, who also advocated excluding Degussa, replied that "Zyklon B is obviously the limit."

In the discussions that followed, several facts emerged. For one, it transpired that it was not by coincidence that the involvement of Degussa had been publicized in Switzerland, because another company that had bid to produce the anti-graffiti substance was located there. Further, the foundation managing the construction, as well as Lea Rosh, had known about Degussa's involvement for at least a year but had not done anything to stop it. Rosh then claimed she had not known about the connections between Degussa and Degesch. It also transpired that another Degussa subsidiary, Woermann Bauchemie GmbH, had already poured the foundation for the stelae. A problem with excluding Degussa from the project was that many of the stelae had already been covered with Degussa's product. These would have to be destroyed if another company were to be used instead. The resulting cost would be about €2.34 million. In the course of the discussions about what to do, which lasted until 13 November, most of the Jewish organizations including the Central Council of Jews in Germany spoke out against working with Degussa, while the architect Peter Eisenman, for one, supported it.

On 13 November, the decision was made to continue working with the company, and was subsequently heavily criticized. German-Jewish journalist, author, and television personality Henryk M. Broder said that "the Jews don't need this memorial, and they are not prepared to declare a pig sty kosher."

=== Completion and opening ===
On 15 December 2004, the memorial was finished. It was dedicated on 10 May 2005, as part of the celebration of the 60th anniversary of V-E Day and opened to the public two days later, along with the information centre. It was originally to be finished by 27 January 2004, the 59th anniversary of the liberation of Auschwitz.

The inauguration ceremony, attended by all the senior members of Germany's government, including Chancellor Gerhard Schröder, took place in a large white tent set up on the edge of the memorial field itself, only metres from the place where Hitler's underground bunker was. Holocaust survivor Sabina Wolanski was chosen to speak on behalf of the six million dead. In her speech, she noted that although the Holocaust had taken everything she valued, it had also taught her that hatred and discrimination are doomed to fail. She also emphasized that the children of the perpetrators of the Holocaust are not responsible for the actions of their parents. The medley of Hebrew and Yiddish songs that followed the speeches was sung by Joseph Malovany, cantor of the Fifth Avenue Synagogue in New York, accompanied by the choir of the White Stork Synagogue in Wrocław, Poland, and by the Lower Silesian German-Polish Philharmonic Youth Orchestra.

In the first year after it opened in May 2005, the monument attracted over 3.5 million visitors. By the end of 2005 around 350,000 people had visited the information centre, and it is estimated that some 5 million visitors had visited the Information Centre by December 2015. Over those 10 years (2006–2015), 460,000 people on average had visited each year. The foundation operating the memorial considered this a success; its head, Uwe Neumärker, called the memorial a "tourist magnet".

=== Construction defects ===
Three years after the official opening of the memorial, half of the blocks made from compacting concrete started to crack. While some interpret this defect as an intentional symbolization of the immortality and durability of the Jewish community, the memorials' foundation deny this. Some analyze the lack of individual names on the monument as an illustration of the unimaginable number of murdered Jews in the Holocaust. In this way, the memorial illustrates that the number of Jews murdered in the Holocaust was so colossal that is impossible to physically visualize.

Initial concerns about the memorial's construction focused on the possible effects of weathering, fading, and graffiti. Already by 2007, the memorial was said to be in urgent need of repair after hairline cracks were found in some 400 of its concrete slabs. Suggestions that the material used was mediocre have been repeatedly dismissed by Peter Eisenman. In 2012, German authorities started reinforcing hundreds of concrete blocks with steel collars concealed within the stelae after a study revealed they were at risk of crumbling under their own mass.

== Information Bureau ==
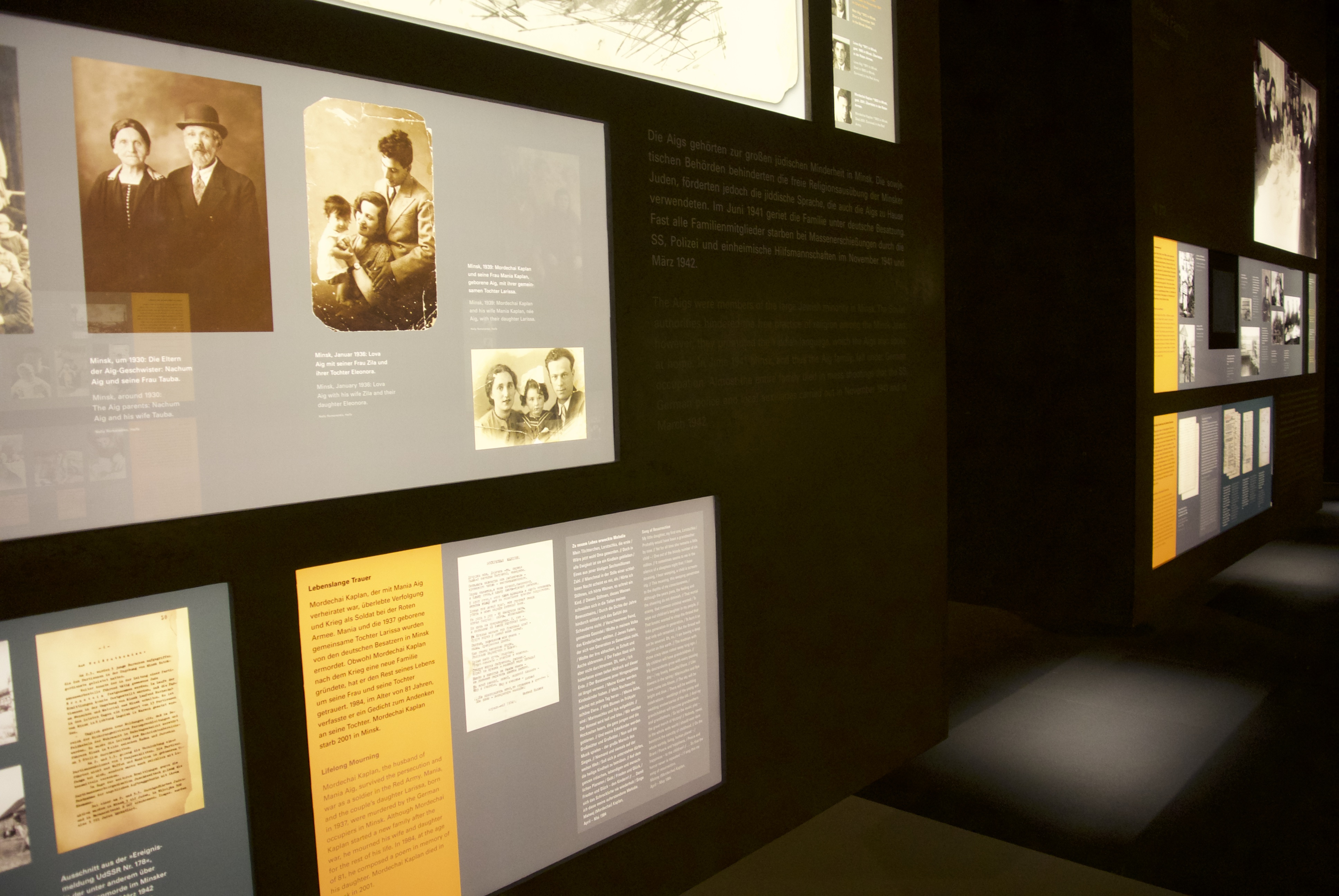
Display in the information centre

The information centre is located at the site's eastern edge, beneath the field of stelae. The visitor display begins with a timeline that lays out the history of the Final Solution, from when the National Socialists took power in 1933 through the murder of more than a million Soviet Jews in 1941. The rest of the exhibition is divided into four rooms dedicated to personal aspects of the tragedy, e.g. the individual families or the letters thrown from the trains that transported them to the death camps. The Room of Families focuses on the fates of 15 specific Jewish families. In the Room of Names, names of all known Jewish Holocaust victims obtained from the Yad Vashem memorial in Israel are read out loud. Each chamber contains visual reminders of the stelae above: rectangular benches, horizontal floor markers and vertical illuminations.

Critics have questioned the placement of the centre. It is discreetly placed on the eastern edge of the monument. Architecturally, the information centre's most prominent feature lies in its coffered concrete ceilings. The undulating surfaces mirror the pattern of the pillars and pathways overhead, causing the visitor to feel like they have entered a collection of graves. "Aesthetically, the Information Center runs against every intention of the open memorial. The aboveground pavilion of the subterranean documentation area mars the steady measure of the order of rectangles. Admittedly, all objections against this pedagogical extra fall silent when one has descended the stairs to the Information Center and entered the first four rooms".

The visitors centre contains and displays some of the most important moments and memories of the Holocaust, through carefully chosen examples in a concise and provocative display. The entrances cut through the network of paths defined by the stelae, and the exhibit area gives the memorial that which by its very conception it should not have: a defined attraction. "The exhibitions are literal, a sharp contrast to the amorphous stelae that the memorial is composed of. "It is as if they (exhibits) were directed at people who cannot find the capacity to believe that the Holocaust occurred".

== Interpretations ==
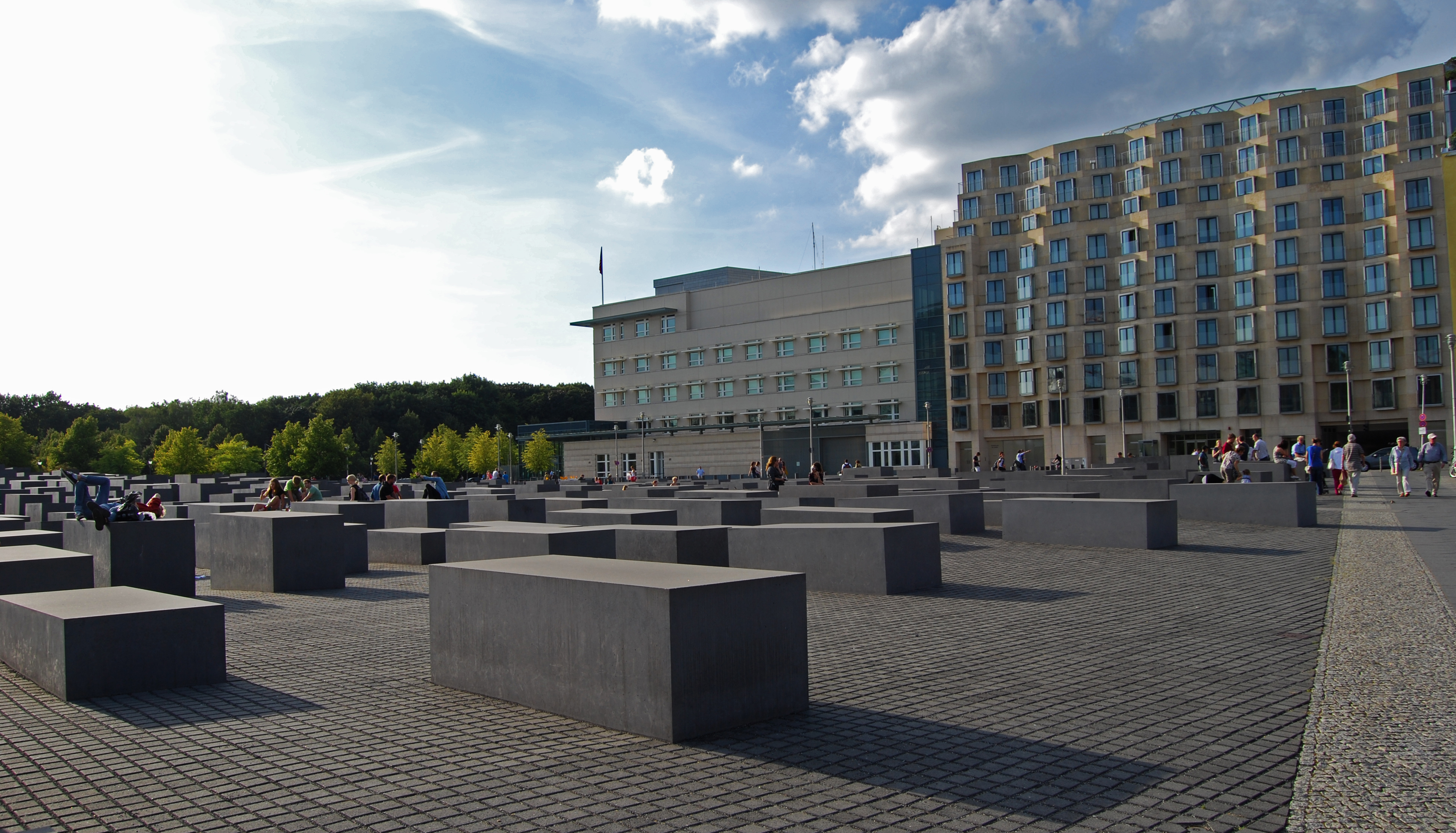
Irregularly positioned blocks

According to Eisenman's project text, the stelae are designed to produce an uneasy, confusing atmosphere, and the whole sculpture aims to represent a supposedly ordered system that has lost touch with human reason. The Memorial to the Murdered Jews of Europe Foundation official English website states that the design represents a radical approach to the traditional concept of a memorial, partly because Eisenman said the number and design of the monument had no symbolic significance.

However, observers have noted the memorial's resemblance to a Jewish cemetery. The abstract installation leaves room for interpretation, the most common being that of a graveyard. "The memorial evokes a graveyard for those who were unburied or thrown into unmarked pits, and several uneasily tilting stelae suggest an old, untended, or even desecrated cemetery." Many visitors have claimed that from outside the memorial, the field of grey slabs resemble rows of coffins. While each stone slab is approximately the size and width of a coffin, Eisenman has denied any intention to resemble any form of a burial site. The memorial's grid can be read as both an extension of the streets that surround the site and an unnerving evocation of the rigid discipline and bureaucratic order that kept the killing machine grinding along. Wolfgang Thierse, the president of Germany's parliament the Bundestag, described the piece as a place where people can grasp "what loneliness, powerlessness and despair mean". Thierse talked about the memorial as creating a type of mortal fear in the visitor. Visitors have described the monument as isolating, triggered by the massive blocks of concrete, barricading the visitor from street noise and sights of Berlin.

Some visitors and Berliners have also interpreted the contrast between the grey flat stones and the blue sky as a recognition of the "dismal times" of the Holocaust. As one slopes downwards into the memorial entrance, the grey pillars begin to grow taller until they completely consume the visitor. Eventually, the grey pillars become smaller again as visitors ascend towards the exit. Some have interpreted this as the rise and fall of the Third Reich or the Regime's gradual momentum of power that allowed them to perpetrate such atrocities on the Jewish community. The space in between the concrete pillars offers a brief encounter with the sunlight. As visitors wander through the slabs the sun disappears and reappears. One is constantly tormented with the possibility of a warmer, brighter life. Some have interpreted this use of space as a symbolic remembrance of the volatile history of European Jews whose political and social rights constantly shifted. Many visitors have claimed walking through the memorial makes one feel trapped without any option other than to move forward. Some claim the downward slope that directs you away from the outside symbolically depicts the gradual escalation of the Third Reich's persecution of the European Jewish community. First, they were forced into ghettos and removed from society and eventually they were removed from existence. The more a visitor descends into the memorial, they are without any visible contact with the outside world. They are completely ostracized and hidden from the world. It is common for groups of visitors to lose each other as they wander deeper into the memorial. This often reminds one of the separation and loss of family among the Jewish community during the Holocaust.

Some have interpreted the shape and colour of the grey slabs to represent the loss of identity during the Nazi regime. As one moves into the memorial, the space between the shapes widens. Identity in a regime is largely shaped by belongingness defined through 'sameness' and the "repetition of the same". Some blocks are spaced farther apart and are isolated from other blocks. This is often understood as a symbolic representation of the forced segregation and confinement of Jews during the Nazi regime. The continuation of "sameness" and unity in the Nazi regime depended on the act of exclusion. Architectural historian Andrew Benjamin has written that the spatial separation of certain blocks represents "a particular [as] no longer an instance of the whole". The lack of unified shape within the group of blocks has also been understood as a symbolic representation of the "task of remembering". Some of the blocks appear to be unfinished. Some see this unfinished appearance as asserting that the task of remembering the Holocaust is never over. Benjamin has said "The monument works to maintain the incomplete". As the effects of the Holocaust are impossible to fully represent, the memorial's structures have remained unfinished. The missing parts of the structure illustrate the missing members of the Jewish community that will never return. The destruction of the Holocaust has resulted in a missing epoch of Jewish heritage.

The memorial's structures also deny any sense of collectivity. Some have interpreted this to reflect the lack of collective guilt amongst the German population. Others have interpreted the spatial positioning of the blocks to represent individual guilt for the Holocaust. Some Germans have viewed the memorial as targeting German society and claim the memorial is presented as "an expression of our – non-Jewish Germans' – responsibility for the past". The site is also enclosed by borders of trees and Berlin's city centre. The enclosure from these borders has often evoked feelings of entrapment. This can be understood as a symbolic representation of the closure of European and American borders following the Évian Conference that forced Jews to stay in Germany.

Several have noted that the number of stelae is identical to the number of pages in the Babylonian Talmud.

== Public reception and criticism ==
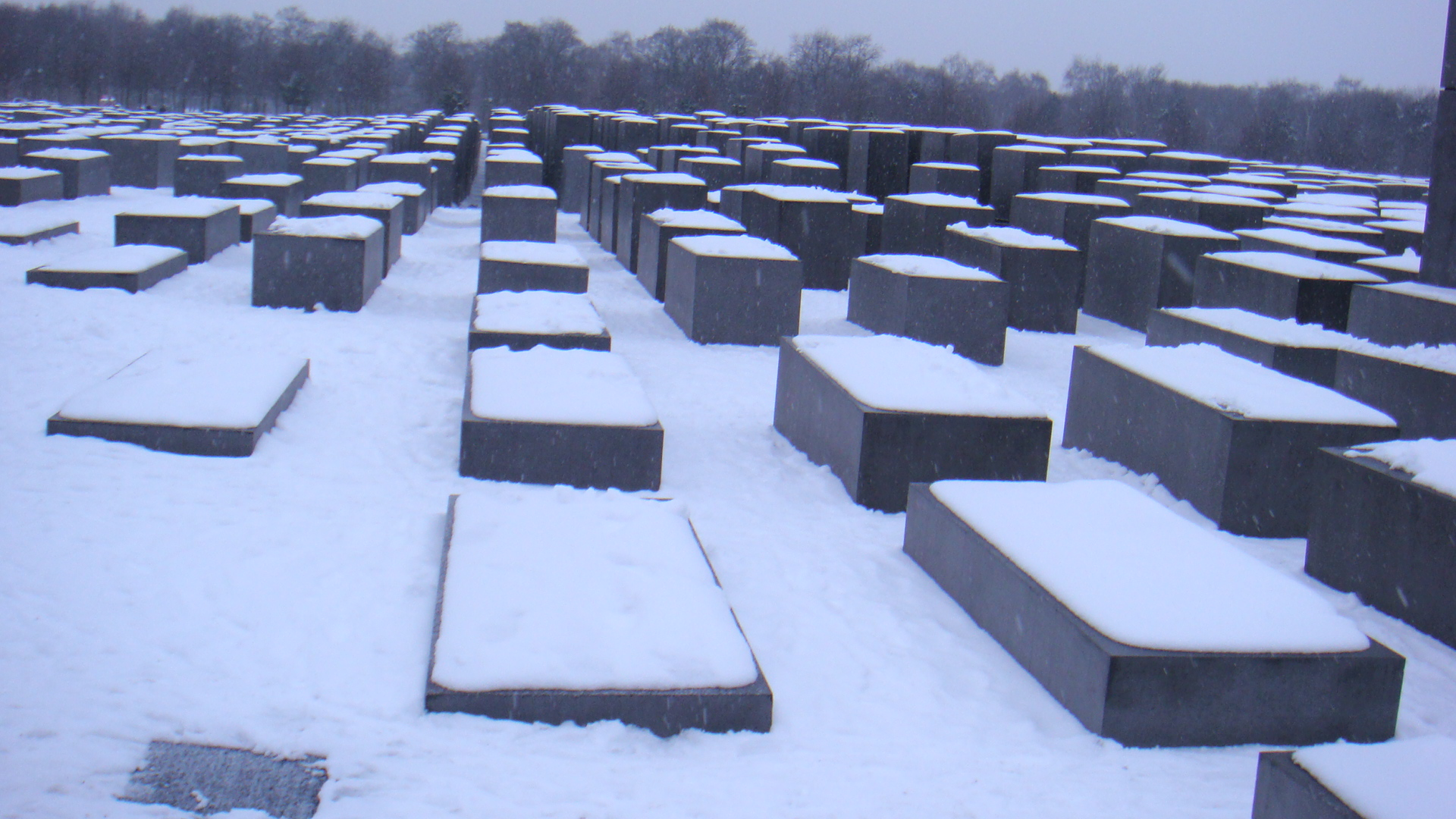
The memorial covered in snow, February 2009

The monument has been criticized for only commemorating the Jewish victims of the Holocaust; however, other memorials have subsequently opened which commemorate other identifiable groups victimised by the Nazis, such as the Memorial to Homosexuals Persecuted Under Nazism (in 2008) and the Memorial to the Sinti and Roma Victims of National Socialism (in 2012). In June 2026, a memorial commemorating Jehovah's Witnesses who were persecuted and murdered by the Nazis was inaugurated. The memorial was designed by Matthias Leeck and is located near the Goldfischteich in the Tiergarten, the site of a 1936 mass arrest carried out by the Gestapo.

Many critics argued that the design should include names of victims, as well as the numbers of people murdered and the places where the murders occurred. Architecture critic Nicolai Ouroussoff claimed the memorial "is able to convey the scope of the Holocaust's horrors without stooping to sentimentality – showing how abstraction can be the most powerful tool for conveying the complexities of human emotion."

Some Germans have argued the memorial is only statuary and does little to honor those murdered during the Nazi regime. Some claimed the erection of the memorial ignored Germany's responsibility to engage in more active forms of remembrance. Others assert that the erection of the memorial ignored the SED's totalitarianism. Certain German civilians were angered that no memorial had been erected remembering the flight and expulsion of Germans from Eastern territories. Some critics claimed there was no need for a memorial in Berlin as several concentration camps were memorialized, honoring the murdered Jews of Europe. Others have claimed the presence of a memorial in Berlin is essential to remember the once-thriving Jewish community in Berlin.

In early 1998, a group of leading German intellectuals, including writer Günter Grass, argued that the monument should be abandoned. Several months later, when accepting the Peace Prize of the German Book Trade, German novelist Martin Walser cited the Holocaust Memorial. Walser decried "the exploitation of our disgrace for present purposes." He criticized the "monumentalization", and "ceaseless presentation of our shame." And said: "Auschwitz is not suitable for becoming a routine-of-threat, an always available intimidation or a moral club [Moralkeule] or also just an obligation. What is produced by ritualisation, has the quality of a lip service".

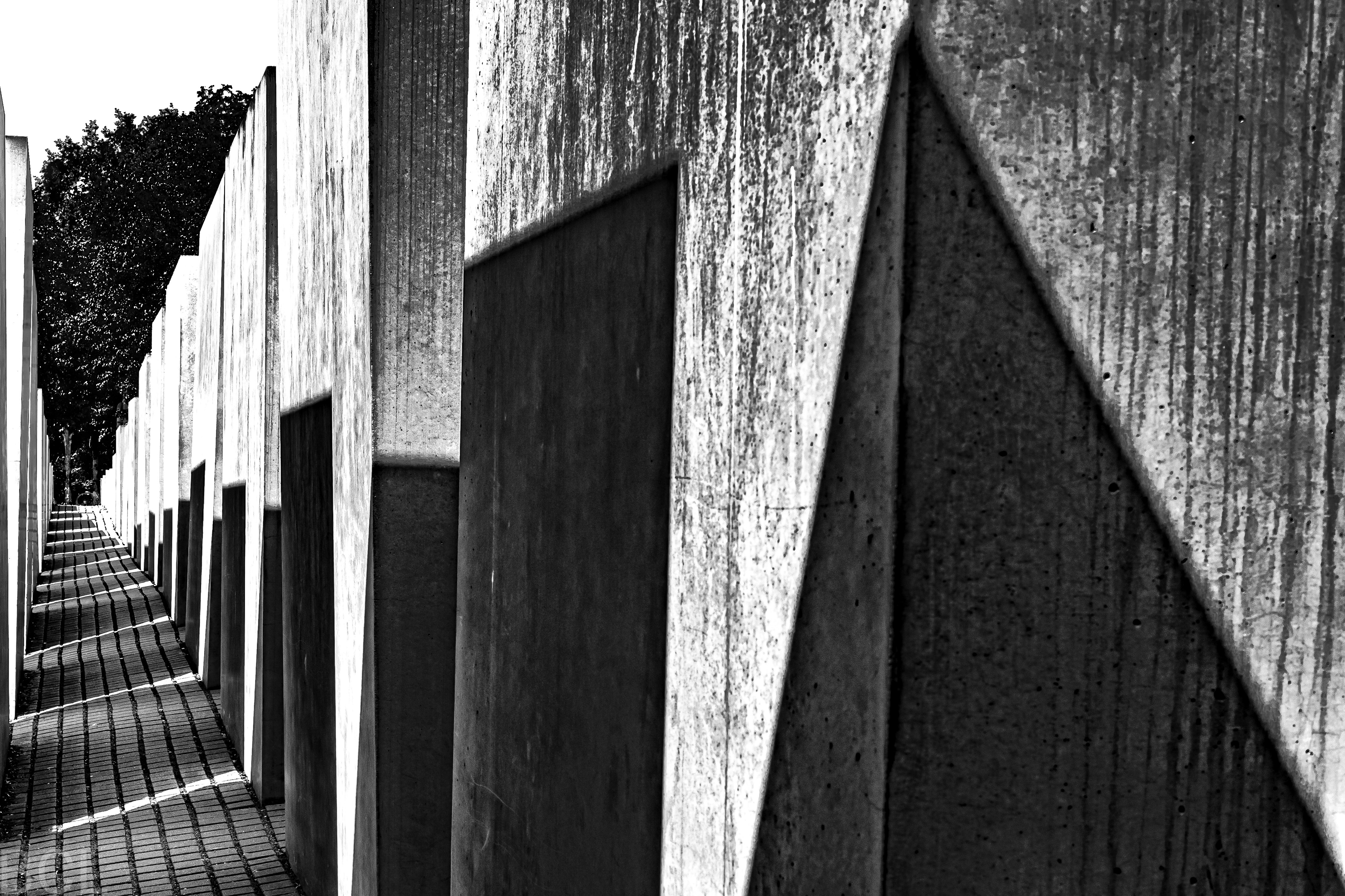
Close-up showing texture

Eberhard Diepgen, mayor of Berlin 1991–2001, had publicly opposed the memorial and did not attend the groundbreaking ceremony in 2000. Diepgen had previously argued that the memorial is too big and impossible to protect.

Reflecting the continuing disagreements, Paul Spiegel, then the president of the Central Council of Jews in Germany and a speaker at the opening ceremony in 2005, expressed reservations about the memorial, saying that it was "an incomplete statement." He said that by not including non-Jewish victims, the memorial suggests that there was a "hierarchy of suffering," when, he said, "pain and mourning are great in all afflicted families." In addition, Spiegel criticized the memorial for providing no information on the Nazi perpetrators themselves and therefore blunting the visitors' "confrontation with the crime."

In 2005, Lea Rosh proposed her plan to insert a victim's tooth which she had found at the Bełżec extermination camp in the late 1980s into one of the concrete blocks at the memorial. In response, Berlin's Jewish community threatened to boycott the memorial, forcing Rosh to withdraw her proposal. According to Jewish tradition, the bodies of Jews can be buried only in a Jewish cemetery, though rabbi Yitzhak Ehrenberg argued the rule applied only to "bodies or large body parts", not single teeth.

The memorial has also come under fire for perpetuating what some critics call an "obsession with the Holocaust". Michal Bodemann, a professor of sociology at the University of Toronto, is critical of what he calls the "permanent" and "brooding" culture of Holocaust commemoration in Germany. He studies postwar German-Jewish relations and told Die Tageszeitung that Germany's focus on the past overlooks the racist tendencies in society today and suggests a hopelessness toward the future. "My impression is that you hide yourself away in history in order to keep the present from cutting too close".

Many critics found the "vagueness" of the stelae disturbing. The concrete blocks offer no detail or reference to the Holocaust. The title of the monument does not include the words "Holocaust" or "Shoah". Critics have raised questions about the memorial's lack of information. "It doesn't say anything about who did the murdering or why – there's nothing along the lines of 'by Germany under Hitler's regime,' and the vagueness is disturbing". The question of the dedication of the memorial is even more powerful. "In its radical refusal of the inherited iconography of remembrance, Berlin's field of stones also forgoes any statement about its own reason for existence. The installation gives no indication who is to be remembered. There are no inscriptions. One seeks in vain for the names of the murdered, for Stars of David or other Jewish symbols". Many of the installation's greatest critics fear that the memorial does not do enough to address a growing movement of Holocaust deniers. "[T]he failure to mention it at the country's main memorial for the Jews killed in the Holocaust – separates the victims from their killers and leaches the moral element from the historical event". Critics say that the memorial assumes that people are aware of the facts of the Holocaust. "The reduction of responsibility to a tacit fact that 'everybody knows' is the first step on the road to forgetting". Critics also feared the monument would become a place of pilgrimage for the neo-Nazi movement. With the rise of the alt-right movement in recent years, fears have once again arisen over the sanctity of the monument and its preservation against extremist groups.

=== Vandalism and disrespectful behaviour ===
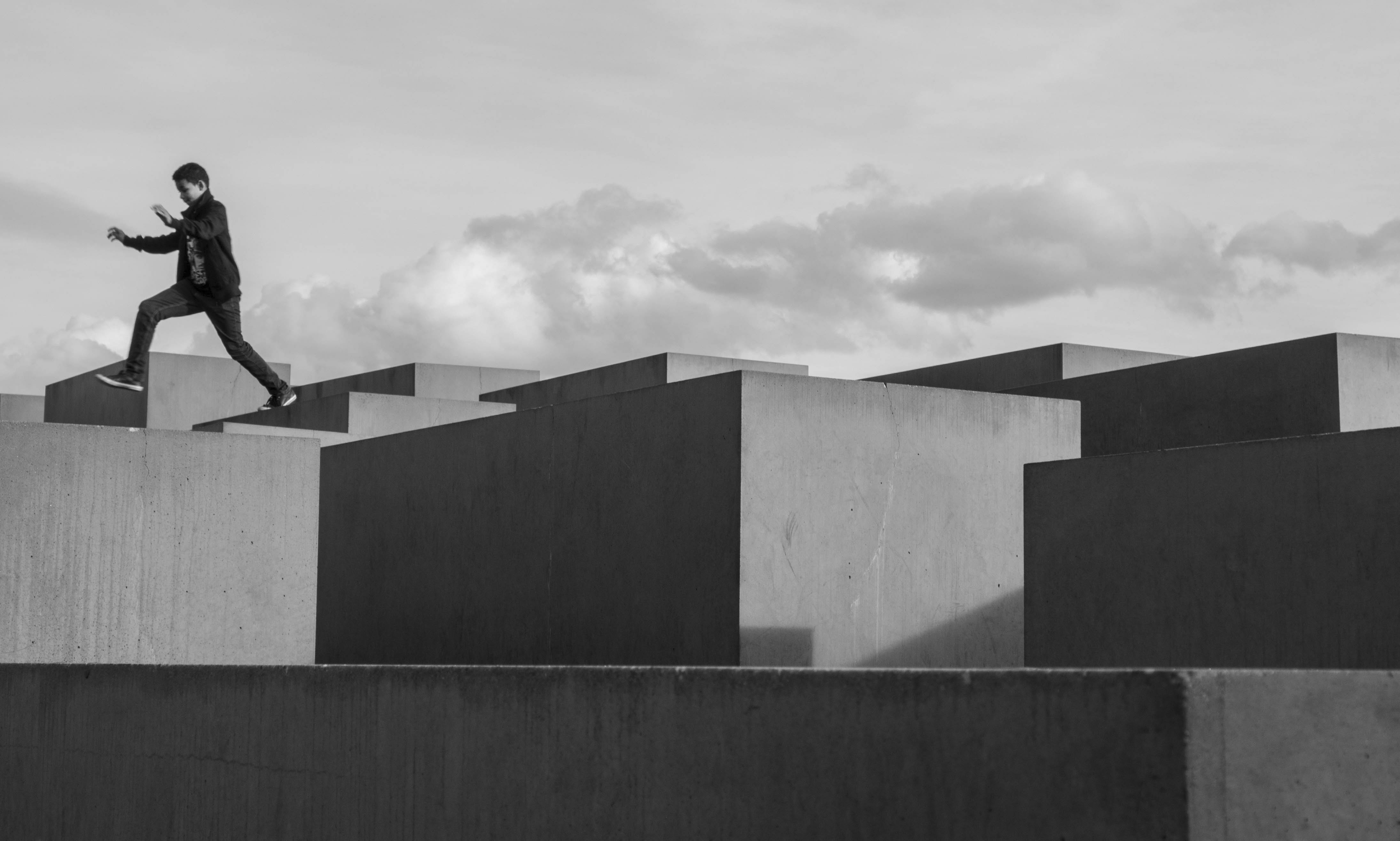
Jumping between stelae

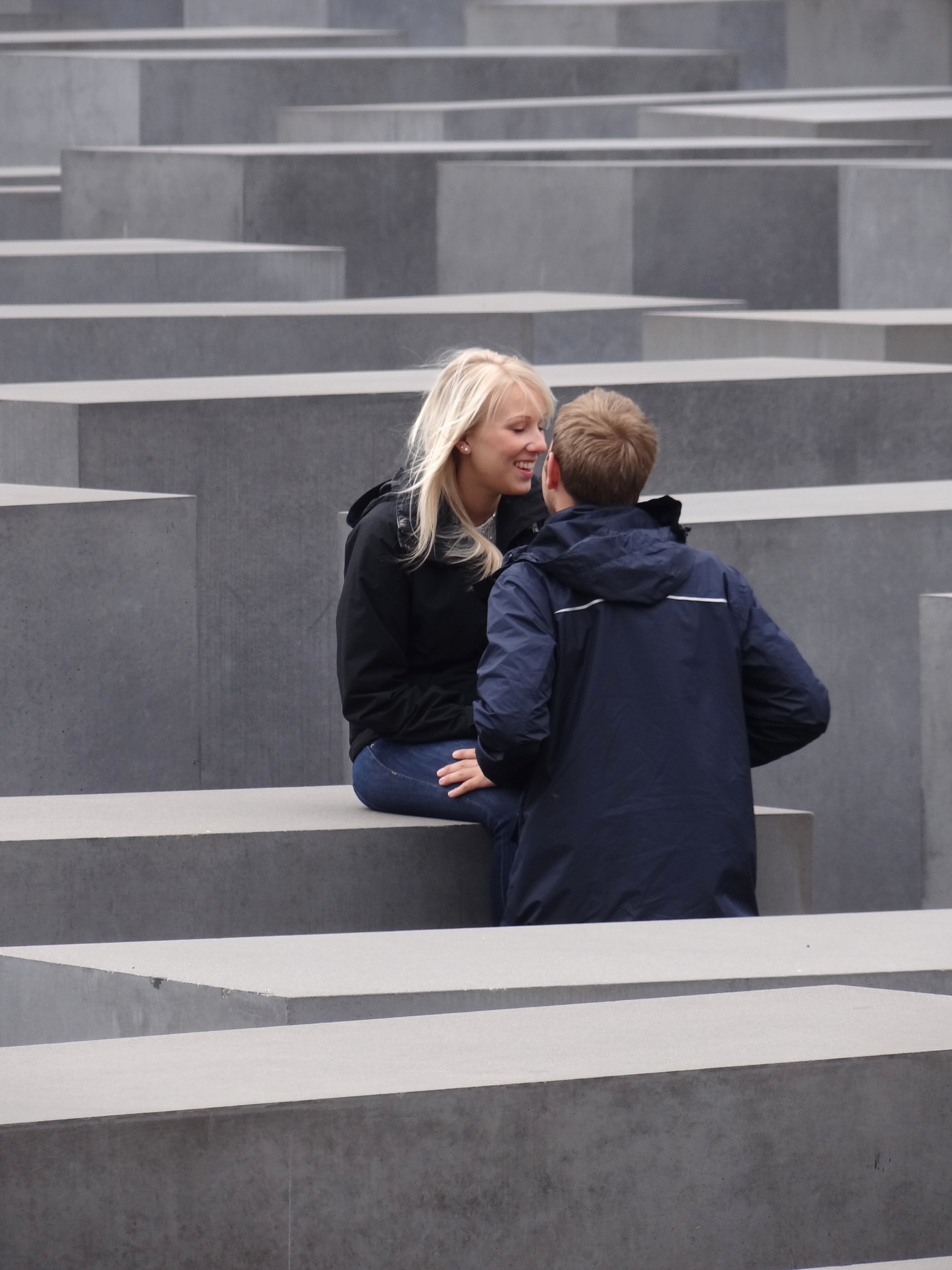
Couple at the memorial

There have been various incidents of vandalism. Despite Eisenman's objections, for example, the pillars were protected by a graffiti-resistant coating because the government worried that neo-Nazis would try to spray paint them with swastikas. Indeed, swastikas were drawn on the stelae on five occasions in its first year. In 2009, swastikas and anti-Semitic slogans were found on 12 of the 2,700 gray stone slabs. In 2014, the German government promised to strengthen security at the memorial after a video published on the Internet showed a man urinating and people launching fireworks from its grey concrete structure on New Year's Eve.

The monument is often used as a recreational space, inciting anger from those who see the playful use of the space as a desecration of the memorial. According to architecture critic Nicolai Ouroussoff, "The day I visited the site, a 2-year-old boy was playing atop the pillars – trying to climb from one to the next as his mother calmly gripped his hand." A 2016 controversy occurred with the app Pokémon Go. "The Foundation Memorial to the Murdered Jews of Europe told The Local that the Holocaust Memorial in Berlin has been reported as a site where people could find and catch Pokemon creatures through the augmented reality game". This caused anger among many people who felt that it was desecrating the site. "This is a memorial space for the six million Jews who were murdered and it is inappropriate for this kind of game," said foundation spokeswoman Sarah Friedrich, adding that she hoped the company would remove the memorial as a possible location. In early 2017, an Israeli artist, Shahak Shapira, after noticing numerous instances on social media such as Facebook, Instagram, Tinder and Grindr of mostly young people posting smiling selfies with the memorial as a backdrop, or photos of themselves doing yoga or otherwise jumping or dancing on the memorial's stone slabs, began an online art project juxtaposing those found images with archival pictures of Nazi death camps, to ironically point out the jarring disconnect of taking such inappropriately cheerful pictures in so somber a setting, calling it "Yolocaust".

In January 2013, the blog Totem and Taboo posted a collection of profile pictures from the gay dating app Grindr, taken at the memorial. The emerging trend met with mixed responses: while Grindr's then CEO Joel Simkhai, himself Jewish and gay, asserted that he was "deeply moved" that his app members "take part in the memory of the holocaust", there was international criticism of use of the memorial as a backdrop for hookup profiles, which was held to be disrespectful.

On 21 February 2025, a stabbing attack occurred at the Memorial. A 19-year-old Syrian refugee seriously wounded a 30-year-old Spanish man. The attacker was subsequently convicted and sentenced to 13 years' imprisonment.

== See also ==
- Culture of Remembrance
- Holocaust memorial landscapes in Germany
- Memorial to the Victims of Fascism and Militarism
- Memorial to Polish Soldiers and German Anti-Fascists
- Shoes on the Danube Bank Memorial built in Budapest in 2005
- Soviet War Memorial (Treptower Park)
- United States Holocaust Memorial Museum
- 2025 Berlin Holocaust memorial stabbing
