= Berlin Holocaust memorial stabbing =

2025 stabbing attack in Berlin, Germany

2025 Berlin Holocaust memorial stabbing
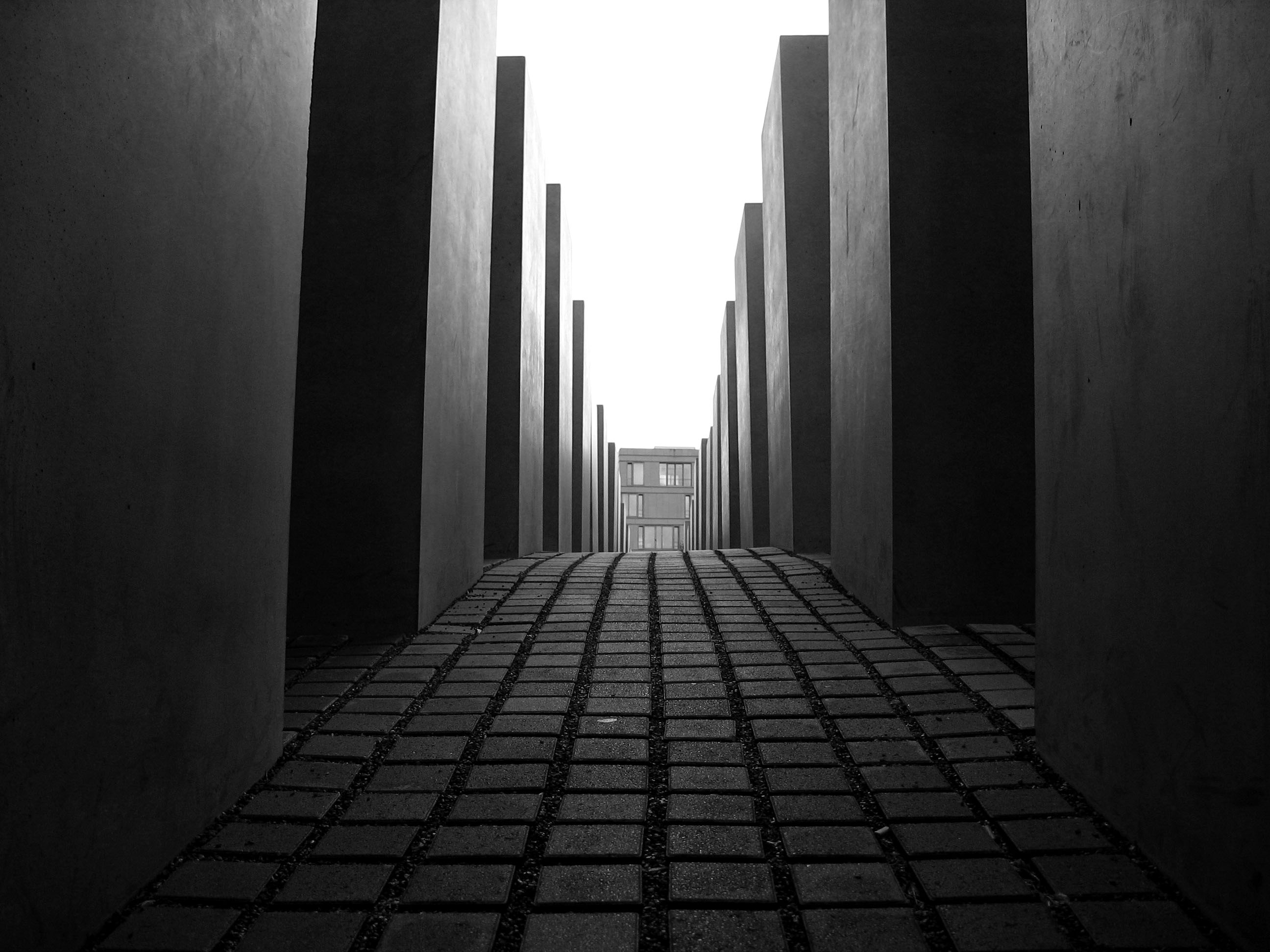
- Berlin Holocaust memorial
- Location: Berlin, Germany
- Date: 21 February 2025
- Target: Jews
- Attack type: Stabbing
- Weapon: Knife
- Injuries: Spanish tourist
- Perpetrator: Wassim al M.
- Motive: Antisemitism, Islamism

On 21 February 2025, a knife attack occurred at Berlin's Holocaust Memorial, resulting in the severe injury of a 30-year-old Spanish tourist. The perpetrator, identified as 19-year-old Syrian asylum seeker Wassim al M, reportedly expressed a desire to kill Jews. He was convicted and sentenced to 13 years' imprisonment in 2026.

== Background ==
Since the October 7 attacks on Israel, Germany has experienced a sharp increase in antisemitic incidents. The tensions in the Middle East have triggered a surge in hate crimes targeting Jewish communities across Europe.

Prior to the stabbing at Berlin's Holocaust Memorial, German authorities arrested an 18-year-old Russian national earlier that day on suspicion of planning an attack on the Israeli Embassy in Berlin. The suspect, reportedly of Chechen ethnicity, was believed to have connections to the Islamic State and intended to carry out a firearms assault on the embassy. This arrest was separate from the subsequent stabbing incident at the Holocaust Memorial with no reported connections.

== Stabbing ==
On Friday, February 21, 2025, the assailant identified as 19-year-old Syrian asylum seeker Wassim al M., armed with a hunting knife, approached the victim from behind and inflicted life-threatening injuries by attempting to slit his throat. The victim, a 30-year-old Spanish tourist from Bilbao, was immediately transported to a hospital, where an induced coma stabilized his condition. Following the attack, the suspect fled the scene but was apprehended by authorities a few hours later, still bearing traces of blood. At the time of his arrest, he was found in possession of a hunting knife, a Quran, a prayer rug, and a note containing Quranic verses, indicating a potential religious motivation. The perpetrator had been planning the attack for several weeks, driven by a desire to "kill Jews."

== Perpetrator and conviction ==
The perpetrator was identified as Wassim al M., a 19-year-old Syrian asylum seeker. Wassim was born in January 2006 in Al-Shaddadi, a small town in Syria. He entered Germany on May 9, 2023, as an unaccompanied minor, possibly via the Balkan route, and was granted asylum. He was assigned to the state of Saxony, where he lived in a refugee accommodation in Leipzig. Prior to the attack, Wassim had come into contact with authorities in Saxony for minor offenses. On 5 March 2026, a Berlin district court convicted Wasim on charges of attempted murder, grievous bodily harm and attempted membership in a foreign terrorist organization and sentenced him to 13 years' imprisonment. Upon convincing and sentencing, the presiding judge mentioned that Wasim had carried out the attack in the name of the Islamic State and that he chose the Holocaust memorial as a target because "he believed he would find people of Jewish faith there".

== See also ==
- Antisemitism in Islam
- Islamic antisemitism in Europe
- 2024 Solingen stabbings
- 2024 Munich shooting
- 2024 Mannheim stabbing
- 2024 Magdeburg car attack
- 2025 Munich car attack
- 2025 Mannheim car attack
