= Lea Rosh =

German television journalist (born 1936)

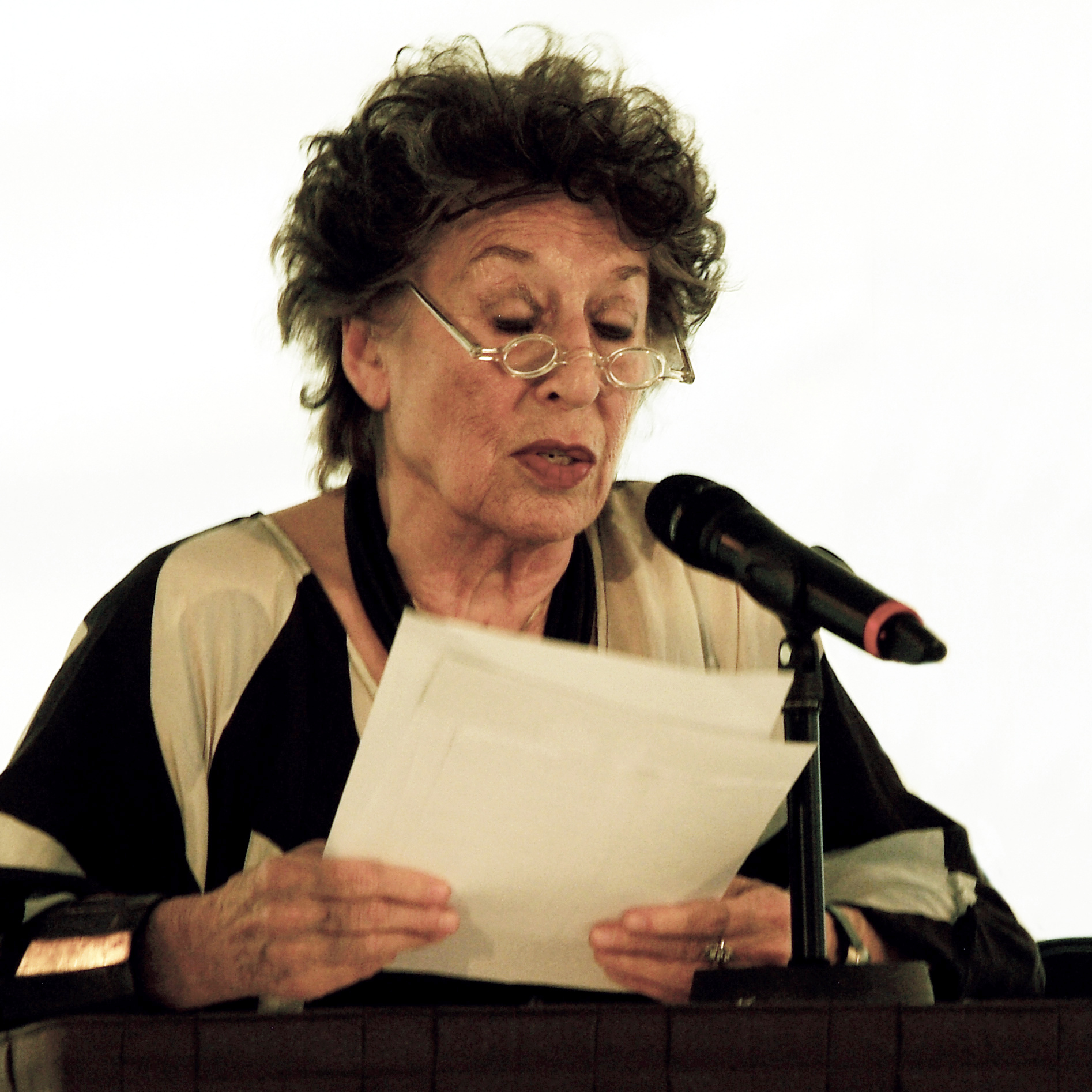
- Lea Rosh (2012)
- Born: Edith Renate Ursula Rosh; 1 October 1936 (age 90); Berlin, Germany
- Occupation: journalist
- Website: www.lea-rosh.de

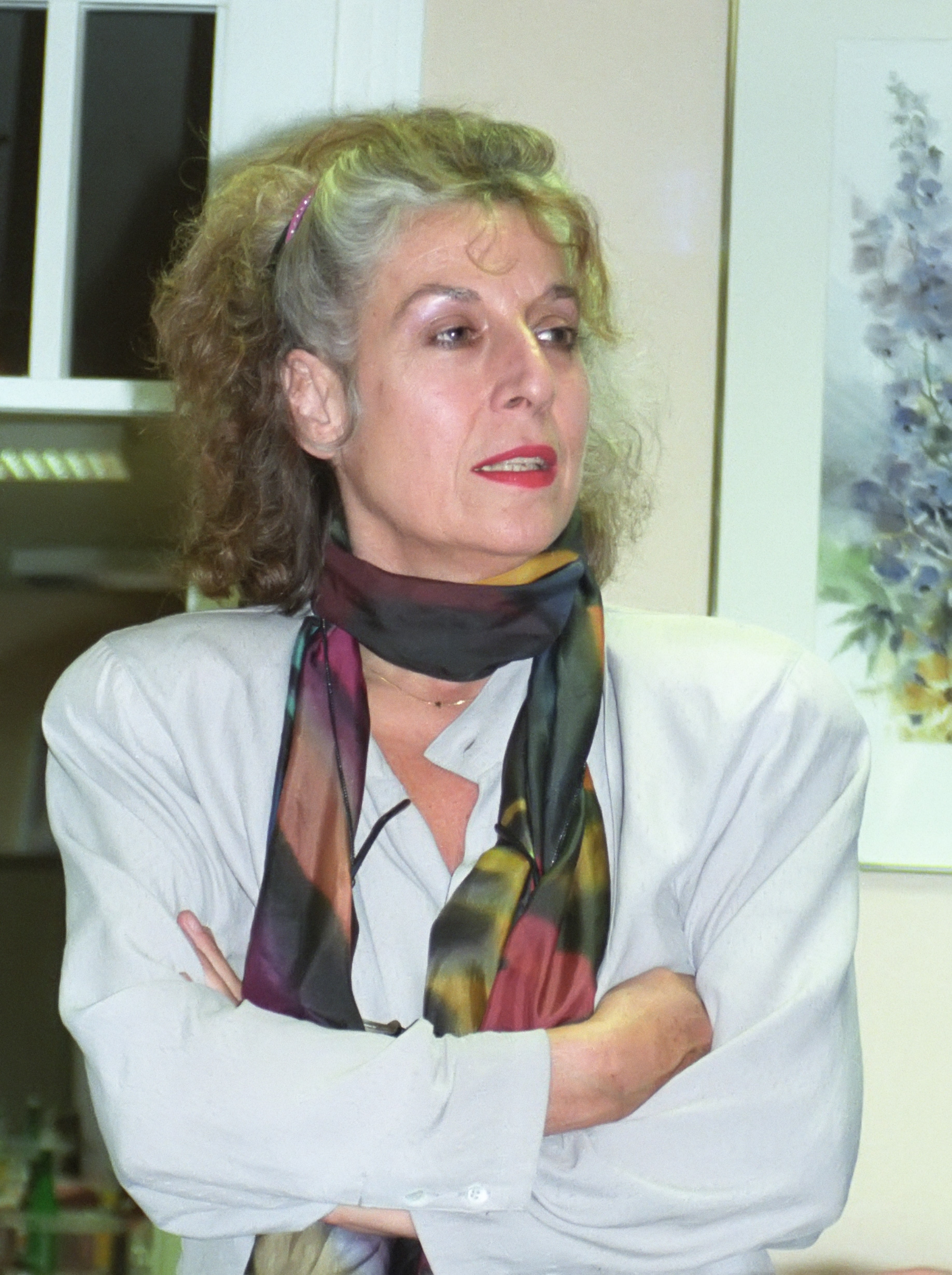
Rosh in 1990

Lea Rosh (German pronunciation: [ˈʁoːs]; born Edith Renate Ursula Rosh; 1 October 1936) is a German television journalist, publicist, entrepreneur and political activist. Rosh was the first female journalist to manage a public broadcasting service in Germany and in the 1970s the first anchorwoman of Kennzeichen D, a major political television program. She has been a member of the SPD since 1968.

Rosh has received major public awards (e.g. the Bundesverdienstkreuz), and is a controversial and influential figure in the local political scene of Berlin. The Memorial to the Murdered Jews of Europe in Berlin is seen as her main and personal achievement.

== Background ==
Rosh was born in Berlin in 1936. Her mother's father was a Jewish court singer. Her father was killed in the winter of 1944 as a Wehrmacht soldier in Nazi Germany occupied Poland. At age 18 she left the Lutheran Church in Germany, she describes herself as an atheist. She began to use the first name Lea instead of her given name of Edith, describing the name Edith, which is of Old English origin, as "horribly German".

Rosh worked at various German radio and television services, including the Sender Freies Berlin and the ZDF. From 1991 to 1997 she was appointed director of the Hanover studio of the Norddeutscher Rundfunk (NDR), being the first woman to hold a comparable post in the history of German broadcasting.

Motivated by historian Eberhard Jäckel, she was one of the primary forces who lobbied from 1988 onwards for over 17 years for the construction of the widely controversial Memorial to the Murdered Jews of Europe, completed in May 2005. She has been chairwoman of the Förderkreis zur Errichtung eines Denkmals für die ermordeten Juden Europas (Society for the Promotion of Raising a Monument to the Murdered Jews of Europe) since 1995, and vice chairman of the board of trustees of the Stiftung Denkmal für die ermordeten Juden Europas (Foundation for the Memorial to the Murdered Jews of Europe) since 1999.

In 1990, Rosh and Eberhard Jäckel were awarded the Geschwister-Scholl-Preis for their joint work, Der Tod ist ein Meister aus Deutschland. In 2006, Rosh was awarded the Bundesverdienstkreuz.

Lea Rosh's husband died in 2008. The late Jakob Schulze-Rohr was an architect and building contractor in Berlin and a brother of the film director Peter Schulze-Rohr.

Since 2007 Lea Rosh has held a post as a lecturer at the University of Management and Communication (FH) Potsdam in the fields of Moderating and Media training.

== Public debate ==
Michael Naumann first had opted against the Berlin Holocaust Monument and (similar to the less known Eike Geisel) had interpreted the attempts as a self finding process of the German bourgeoisie and a "hidden conclusion" (heimlicher Schlußstrich) of the Vergangenheitsbewältigung. While, according to Naumann, after 1871 the leading class in the German Empire manifested their historical views in raising retrospective monuments like the Hermannsdenkmal and Völkerschlachtdenkmal and joined in a controversial debate about the planned reconstruction of Heidelberg Castle, the Berlin Republic would use the debates around the Holocaust Monument and the reconstruction of Berliner Stadtschloss for a similar purpose with Lea Rosh being a leading figure in both cases.

According to Claus Leggewie, beyond a selbsttherapeutisches Lebenswerk (lit. self-therapeutic life's work) Rosh's monumental work resulted in a symbol of national identity of her generation as well the Berlin capital. Instead of reflection and insecurity in the face of (especially around Berlin) decaying authentic memorial sites, Rosh's initiative initiated a higher self-consciousness and pride of the "Commemorative World Champion" (Gedenkweltmeister) involved. Rosh's attempts however result in a possibly exclusive stance against Germans with a migration background which do not share the same history.

== Controversies ==
When at the Holocaust monument's dedication on 10 May 2005, Rosh held up a molar tooth which she had retrieved from Belzec concentration camp in 1988, promising to place it in a column at the memorial, the act outraged several prominent German Jewish leaders, notably Paul Spiegel, the then chairman of the Central Council of Jews in Germany, who described the idea as "irreverent". Rosh withdrew her plan and returned the molar to Belzec concentration camp shortly after.

In 2003, Rosh was elected "most embarrassing Berlin woman of the year" (peinlichste Berlinerin) by the readers of Berlin city magazine Tip.

Claus Leggewie criticized her very strongly for "running over" (... überrollt hat) any resistance against "her" monument and for leaving all those who put forward "professionally, pedagogically and aesthetically sound arguments" against her monumental project bereft of nerves, voice, reputation and good faith.

The sociologist Y. Michal Bodemann has criticized Rosh as an example of "professional pseudo-Jews", that is non-Jews "who over-identify with Judaism."
