= Amitzur Shapira =

Israeli athlete and Munich Massacre victim

- עמיצור שפירא
- Born: 9 July 1932; Tel Aviv, Mandatory Palestine
- Died: 6 September 1972 (aged 40); Fürstenfeldbruck, West Germany
- Cause of death: Shot dead by Black September Organization
- Body discovered: Fürstenfeldbruck Air Base
- Resting place: Kiryat Shaul Cemetery
- Occupations: Sprinter, long jumper and track coach
- Relatives: Shahak Shapira (grandson)

Amitzur Shapira (Hebrew: עמיצור שפירא; 9 July 1932 – 6 September 1972) was an Israeli sprinter and long jumper. He was head coach for the Israeli track and field team at the 1972 Summer Olympics in Munich, Germany. He was killed in the Munich massacre.

== Biography ==
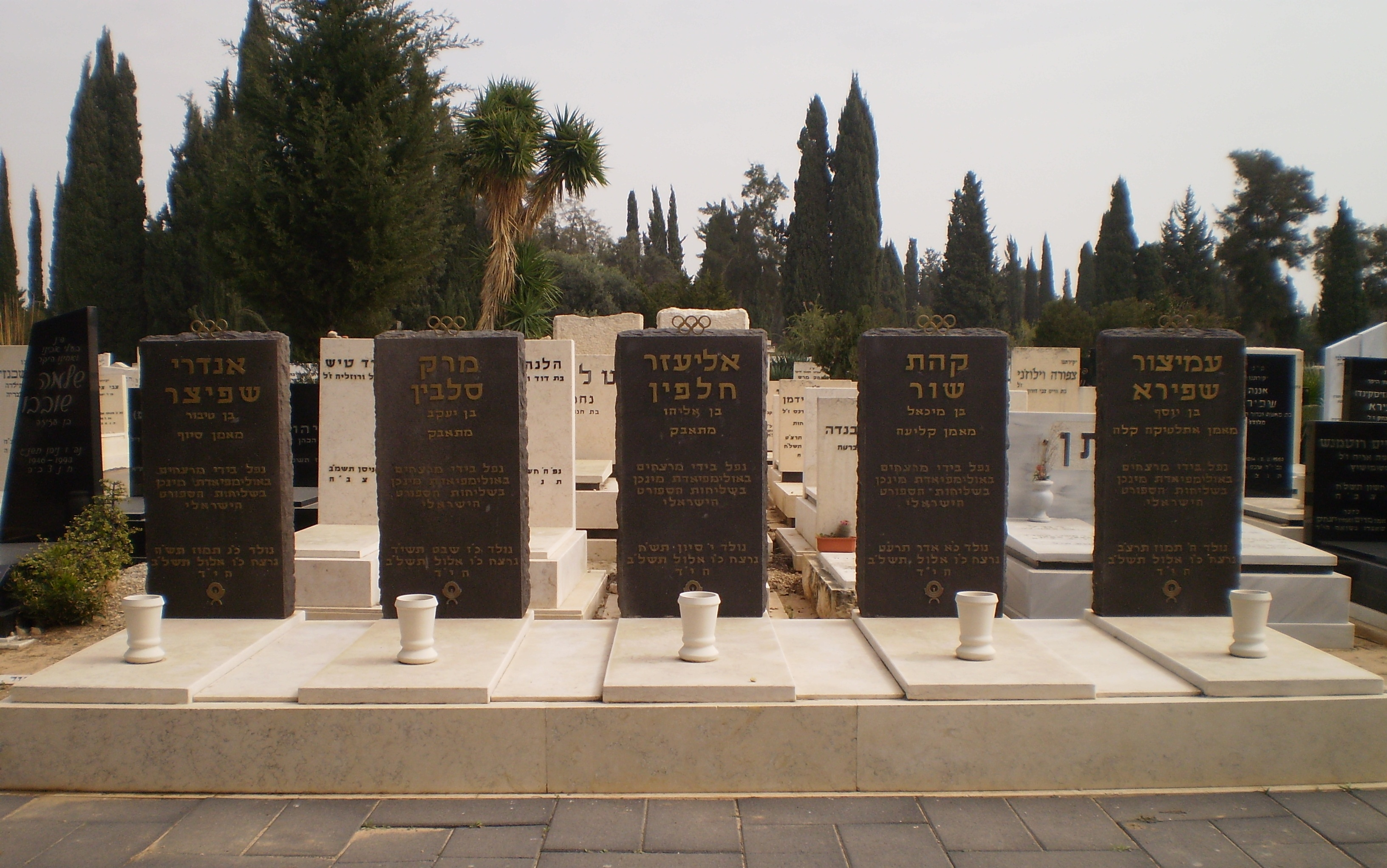
Amitzur Shapira's gravesite, Kiryat Shaul cemetery

Amitzur Shapira was born in Mandatory Palestine and was a resident in Herzliya. For many years, he served as a teacher and educator at the Wingate Institute. Shapira was married with four children.

Shapira attended the 1972 Summer Olympics as the head coach for the Israeli track and field team. During the event he and 10 other members of the Israel Olympic team were taken hostage by Arab terrorists. Two of the Israeli hostages were shot at the beginning of the ordeal and the other nine (including Shapira) were murdered on the tarmac of Furstenfeldbruck airbase during a botched rescue attempt by Munich police and Bavarian border guards.

Shapira was the coach of Esther Shachamarov who later became an Israeli Olympic athlete (in 1976, she became the first Israeli to reach an Olympic final). When she heard that her coach had been murdered she withdrew from the 1972 Olympics.

Shapira was buried in Kiryat Shaul Cemetery in Tel Aviv.

The German artist and comedian Shahak Shapira is one of his grandsons.
