= Shahak Shapira =

German artist and comedian

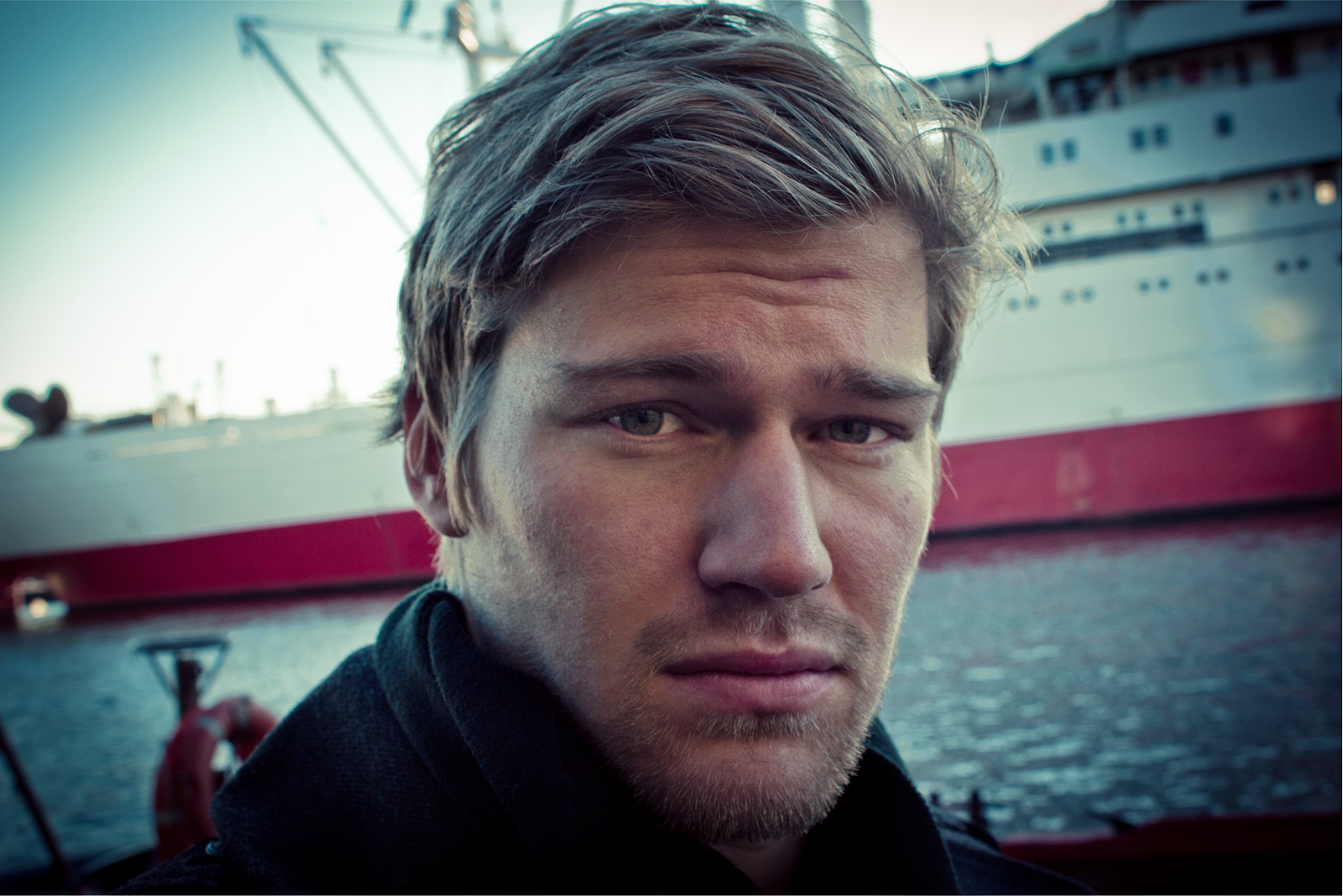
- Born: 1 April 1988 (age 38); Israel
- Citizenship: Germany
- Known for: Provocative art
- Relatives: Amitzur Shapira (grandfather)

Shahak Shapira (Hebrew: שחק שפירא, born 1 April 1988) is a German-Israeli artist, comedian, author and musician. He is currently based in Berlin, Germany.

== Early life ==
Shapira was born in Petah Tikva, Israel and raised in Oranit. Shapira's maternal grandfather was a Holocaust survivor. Shapira's paternal grandfather, Amitzur Shapira, was an Israeli sprinter and a coach for the Israeli track and field team at the 1972 Summer Olympics in Munich, Germany. He was murdered by Palestinian militants in the Munich massacre.

In 2002, Shapira immigrated with his mother and younger brother to Germany. The family took residence in the small town of Laucha in the German state of Saxony-Anhalt. With the Neo-Nazi party (NPD) reaching its statewide highest outcome of 13.55% in 2009's local elections, Shapira described the town as an "eastern German NPD-Stronghold". In 2010, Shapira's younger brother was physically attacked and called a "Jewish pig" by a right-wing extremist.

On New Year's Eve 2014, Shapira was attacked by a group of men after asking them to stop singing antisemitic songs on the subway and refusing to delete a video he recorded, showing the men singing "fuck Jews, fuck Israel" in the middle of the crowded train. The incident was covered by numerous news outlets around the world with Shapira getting the media's attention for refusing to let his case be exploited by right-wing populists to stir up hatred against Muslims.

== Work ==
After New Year's Eve 2014 events, Shapira wrote an autobiographical book about his youth in Israel and Germany, the hostage-taking and murder of his paternal grandfather and the story of his maternal grandfather's survival through the Holocaust. The book was in Germany's Der Spiegel Bestseller list.

In 2015, Shapira launched the "90's Boiler Room" – a parody of the global online music broadcasting platform Boiler Room. It was his first project to gain international attention. Shapira replaced the soundtrack of the live music sessions with 90s-era pop hits by Dr. Alban, N*SYNC and the Backstreet Boys. The parody videos gained millions of views on YouTube and Facebook.

In early 2017, Shapira launched the controversial online art project "Yolocaust", combining selfies from the Berlin Holocaust Memorial with footage from Nazi extermination camps. After noticing numerous instances on social media sites such as Facebook, Twitter, Instagram, Tinder and Grindr of people posting smiling selfies with the memorial as a backdrop, and photos of themselves doing yoga or otherwise jumping or dancing on the memorial's stone slabs, Shapira decided to ironically point out the jarring disconnect of taking such inappropriately cheerful pictures in such a somber setting. The project gained worldwide attention, a video about the project by the online news channel AJ+ was viewed 78 million times on Facebook.

In August 2017, Shapira sprayed 30 homophobic, Islamophobic, anti-Semitic and racist tweets outside Twitter's German headquarters in Hamburg after the social network failed to remove the offensive hate posts from its platform. Explaining his project, named "#HeyTwitter", in a YouTube video, Shapira claimed to having reported around 300 tweets to the company within six months, receiving only nine responses from the company, each rejecting the suggestion that the tweets were a violation of the company's terms of service. After the majority of tweets were not removed, Shapira used washable chalk-spray to take the hateful tweets into the real world and confront Twitter, gaining worldwide attention to his project and Twitter's hate speech policies.

In September 2017, in collaboration with the satirical political party Die PARTEI, Shapira took control of a number of far-right Facebook groups, including several used by high-ranking members of the Alternative for Germany party. The former admins were locked out, the groups were made public and then renamed to, among others "I <3 Antifa" and "Hummus-Liebe".

After the start of the Gaza war, Shapira worked on at least two projects that straddle the divide between the two sides and their supporters. In Stand With Humans, he puts up posters that mimic the Israeli kidnapped posters and the similar Palestinian posters, not identifying the subject's picture as either until the poster is torn, as many of the original versions of the Israeli posters have been torn down by pro-Palestinian activists. In Baklavas From Gaza: Comic Relief for Israel and Palestine, he ordered trials of new material related to the West in a Berlin bar owned by a Palestinian friend.
