= Holocaust memorial landscapes in Germany =

Holocaust memorial landscapes in Germany encompass a large group of commemorative works dealing with the outdoor built environment. Most often these memorials attempt to keep the memory of Holocaust victims alive through dissemination of this memory to the public.

== Theory ==
Since the end of World War II, there has been a question as to how one can adequately commemorate the victims of the Holocaust. For a time, it was often regarded with a sense of amnesia until memorialization efforts emerged. Holocaust memorials in Germany face the difficulty of commemorating the victims of a crime it has itself committed. American feminist historian Claudia Koonz evaluates this difference between memorializing the Holocaust as the perpetrator, rather than the victim.

According to scholar James E. Young, Holocaust memorials today have an anti-redemptive nature, reminding visitors of the horror of the Holocaust. These "countermonuments" work to bring events of the past into present awareness rather than relegate them to the past. These same subjects of cultural amnesia and remembrance of the Holocaust appear in the works of other post-Holocaust artists, such as the German artist Anselm Kiefer, and writers such as Romanian poet Paul Celan.

== Case studies ==
Multiple former concentration and labor camps have undergone redesigns to create memorial landscapes.

=== Bergen-Belsen ===
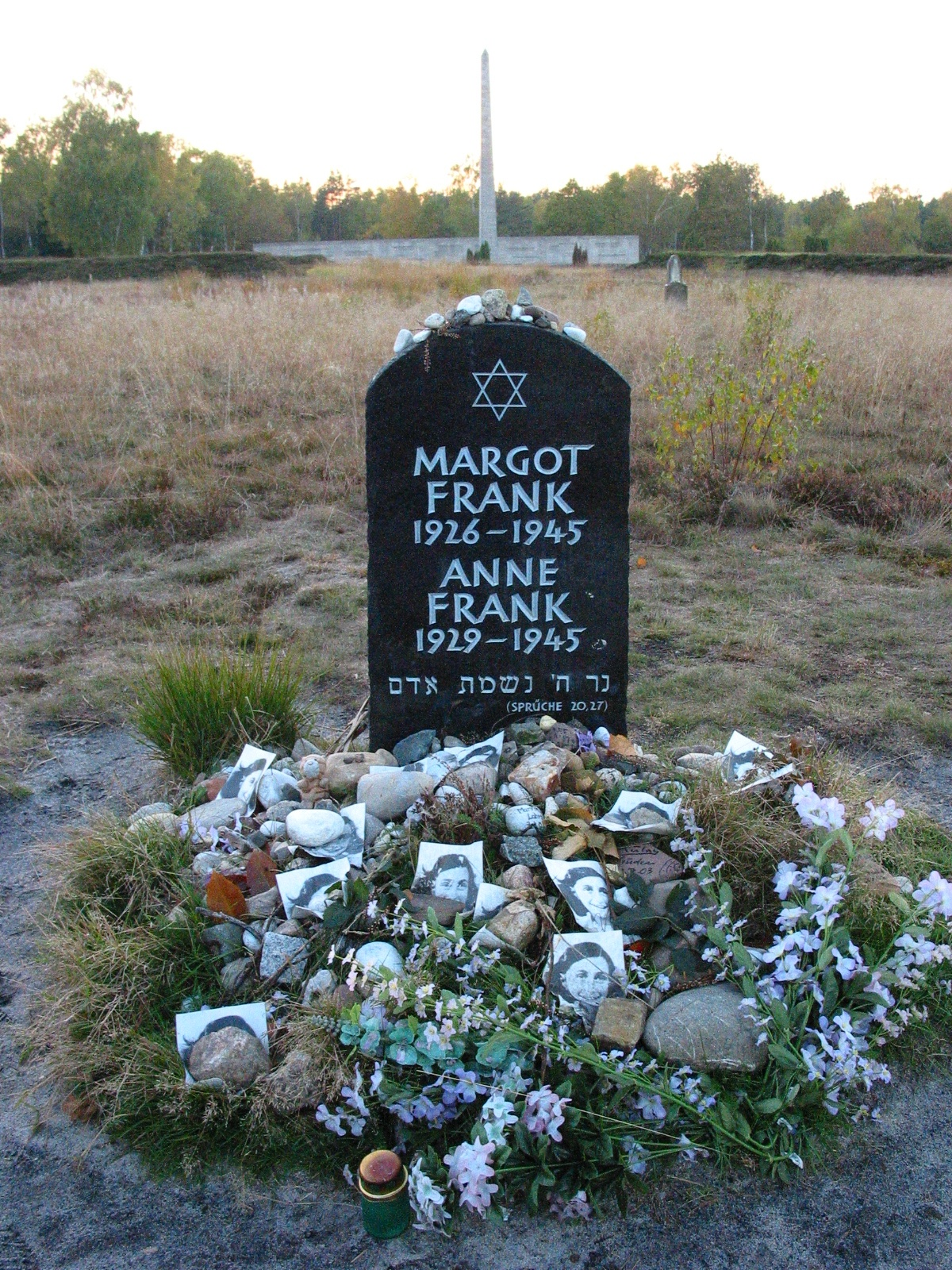
Memorial for Margot and Anne Frank at the former Bergen-Belsen site.

One of the first Holocaust memorial landscapes to come into being was at the Bergen-Belsen concentration camp in Lower Saxony, northwestern Germany. Efforts to establish a commemorative landscape here began shortly after the end of World War II. The core of the design comes from German landscape architect Wilhelm Hübotter who worked on the design in 1945 and 1946. He was removed from the project as his design, featuring native-only plants and references to Germanic burial mounds, was seen as being too in-line with national socialist ideals of a pure German landscape. Hübotter's design was, however, successful in its rejection of the beautification of the site, which was seen as inappropriate to the commemoration of acts of atrocity.

The realized landscape features smaller burial mounds where mass graves exist. Each mound features a stone plaque noting how many thousands of people are buried within. A path links these graves with a commemorative obelisk and a freestanding, inscribed wall at one end of the site. Critics, such as Joachim Wolschke-Bulmahn, claim that the design still engenders a subordination of the commemoration to the landscape itself, therefore playing into the national socialist ideals which caused the Holocaust.

=== Ravensbrück surface relief ===
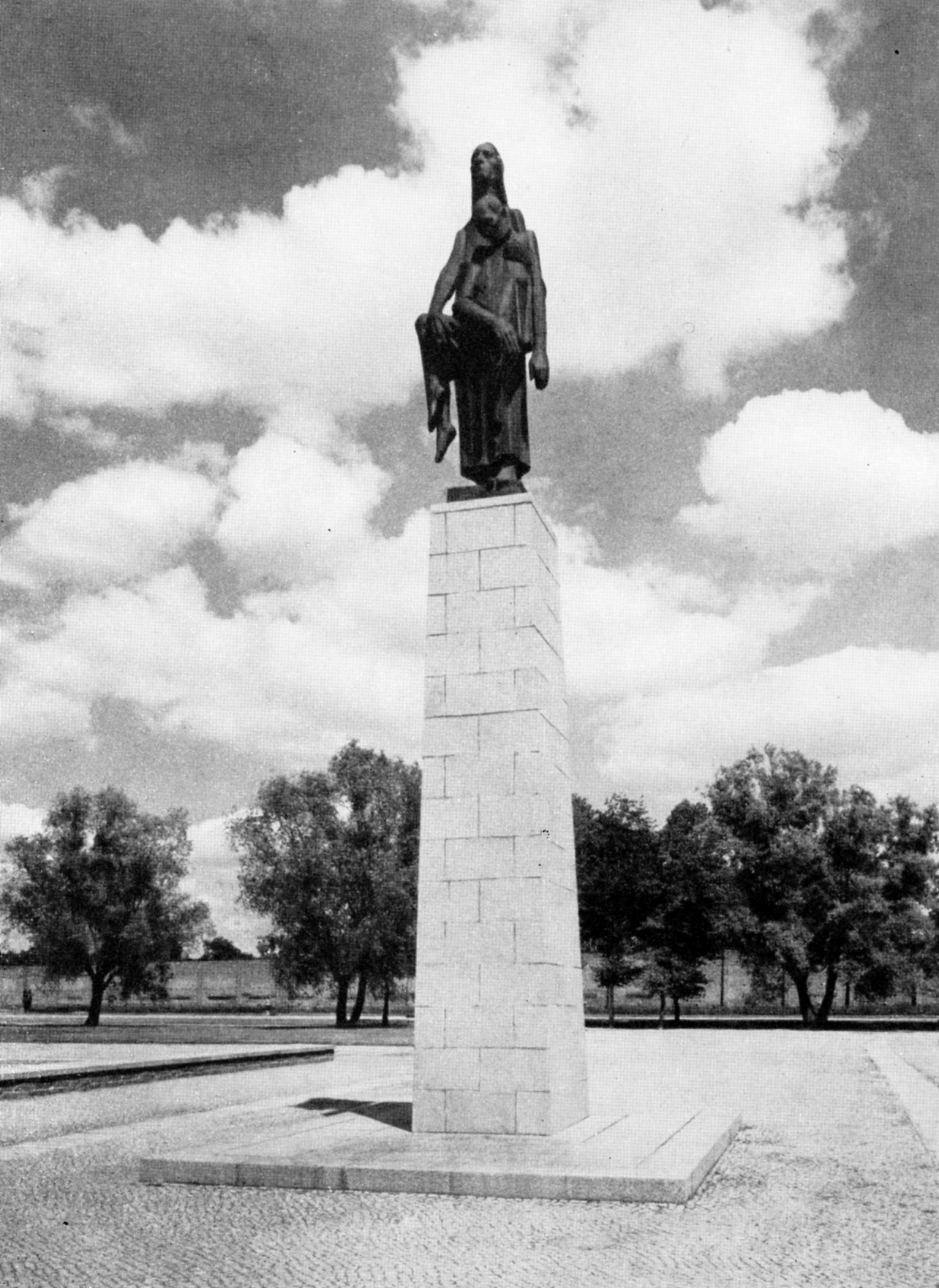
Will Lammert, Memorial Tragende (Woman with Burden) for the Ravensbrück Concentration Camp memorial site, 1959

More recent attempts at memorializing concentration camp landscapes have taken different approaches. In the 1990s an international design competition was held for the redesign of the landscape at the former women's concentration camp at Ravensbrück, also in Germany; the competition was won by the German practice of Burger + Tischer. On this site, where many of the original structures were demolished and which was later occupied by the Soviet army, little of the original layout remained intact. The winning scheme proposed an excavation of the site by volunteers, gradually creating a surface relief. This process would expose old foundations and the layout of the camp, whose borders would then be reforested to accentuate the boundaries. At the section of the site where youth were detained, a field of flowers acts as a memorial where no other visual traces remain.

=== Black Garden of Nordhorn ===
Memorial landscapes and gardens which commemorate the losses of the Holocaust also exist on sites which were not directly related to the crimes of the Nazi regime. These designs tend to approach the memory of the Holocaust in a different way, often intending to provoke rather than console the visitor. Rather than sealing off this disturbing aspect of German history, these commemorative landscapes attempt to bring their memory into the present public consciousness.

In Nordhorn, artist Jenny Holzer was commissioned to redesign a memorial to the fallen of Germany's three previous wars, including World War II. Next to the existing monolith, she designed a circular garden consisting of concentric rings of plantings and pathways. She employed a high level of symbolism, including benches with etchings such as "The ocean washes the dead" that render them undesirable to sit upon, creating discomfort for the visitor. Called "The Black Garden", Holzer's design also features plants with dark foliage and blossoms, including an Arkansas Black apple tree, black Mondo grass, dark-leafed geranium and common bugle with dark purple leaves, adding to the melancholy nature of the garden. The apple tree itself adds to the symbolism of the garden, Holzer states it is meant to evoke Biblical notions of man's curiosity about doing wrong. In the spring, a single spot of white tulips, planted in front of the plaque for victims of National Socialism, contrast with hundreds of black tulips.

=== Berlin Steles ===
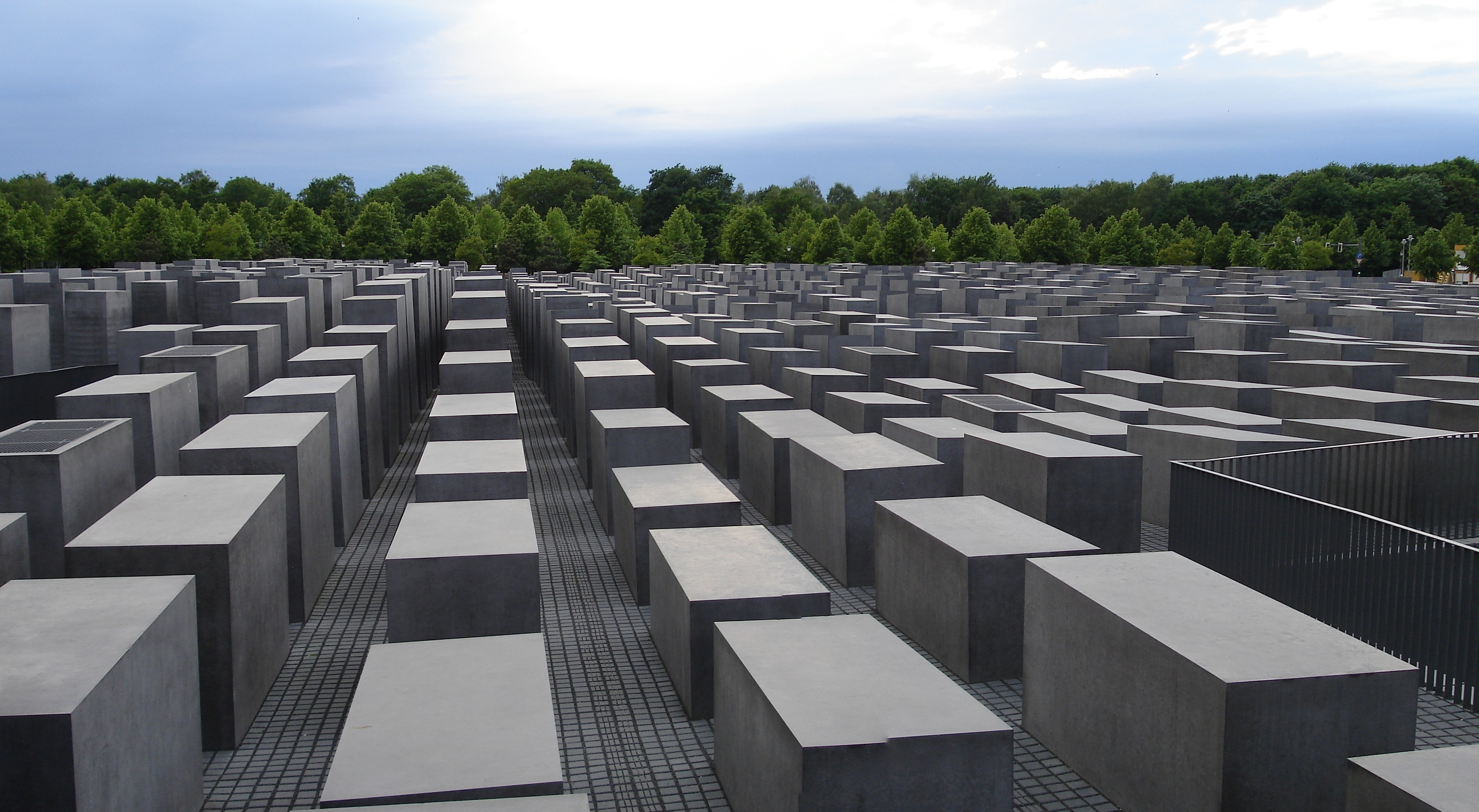
The memorial, May 2007.

Berlin showcases another Holocaust memorial landscape: the Memorial to the Murdered Jews of Europe. Designed by Peter Eisenman, the memorial consists of 2,711 concrete steles, of different heights through which visitors can walk. While Eisenman does not explicitly explain the meaning behind these forms, Constanze Petrow speculates that their collective form provides both a recollection of traditional Jewish cemeteries as well as a sense of loss of the Jewish community through the contrast of the quiet space of the memorial with the noise of the surrounding city.

== See also ==
- Memorial to gay and lesbian victims of National Socialism

== See also ==
- List of Holocaust memorials
