= Protectosil =

Coating for building surfaces

Protectosil is a silane manufactured by Evonik and marketed as a protective coating for building surfaces. It is used as a water repellent, and for corrosion and graffiti control.
