= Westfalen-Blatt =

- Type: Daily newspaper
- Format: Broadsheet
- Founded: 1839
- Language: German
- Headquarters: Bielefeld
- Country: Germany
- Website: westfalen-blatt.de

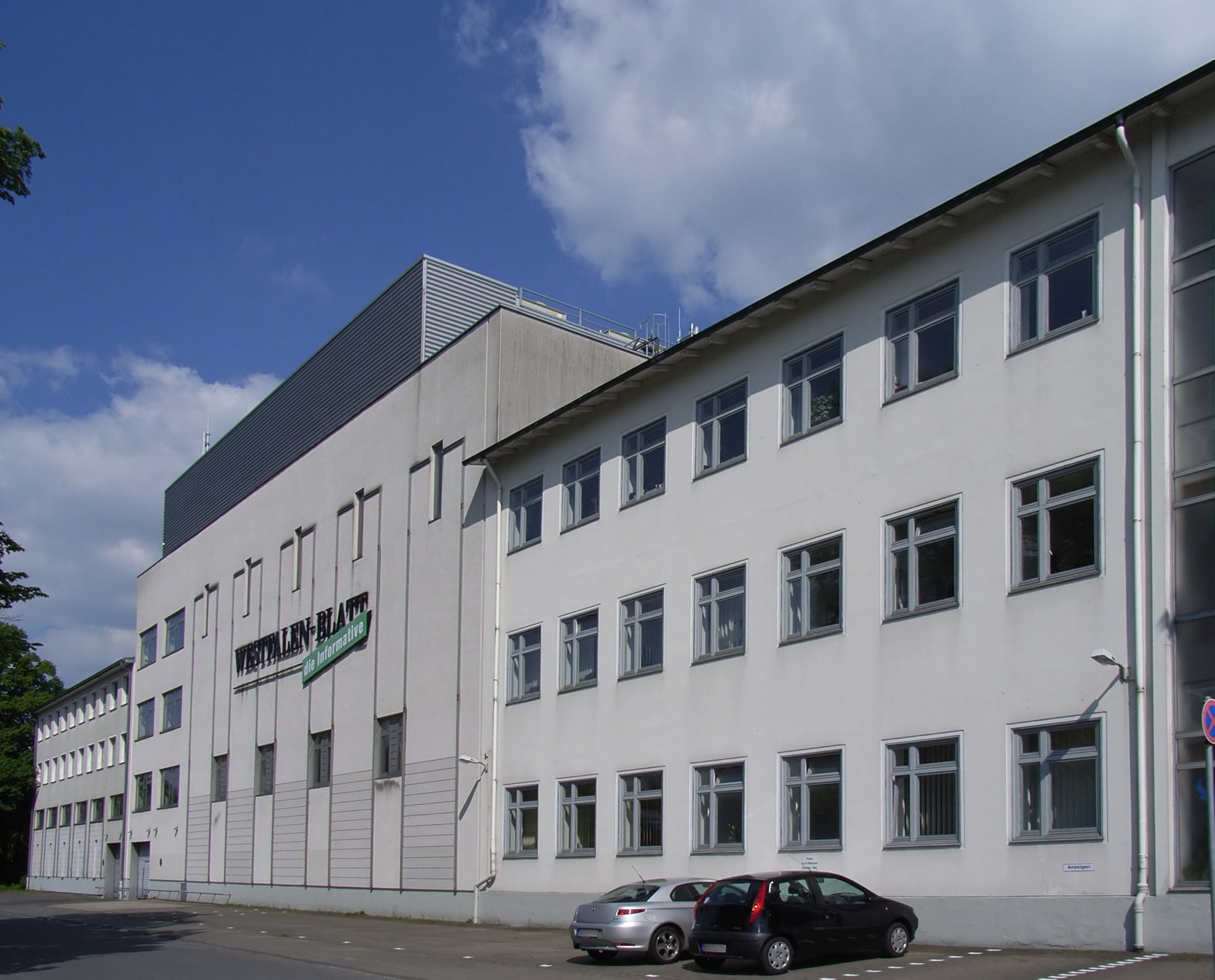
Westfalen-Blatt headquarters, Bielefeld

Westfalen-Blatt is a Germany-based German language newspaper founded in 1839.

== Background ==
Westfalen-Blatt is a regional daily newspaper with headquarters in Bielefeld. It is a subsidiary of Westfälische Medien Holding AG.

While publishing under the paper's original name Westfalen-Zeitung, the paper became Bielefeld's first independent newspaper after the Second World War, on March 15, 1946, eleven months after the liberation of Bielefeld.
