= 2016 Berlin truck attack =

2016 truck attack in Berlin, Germany

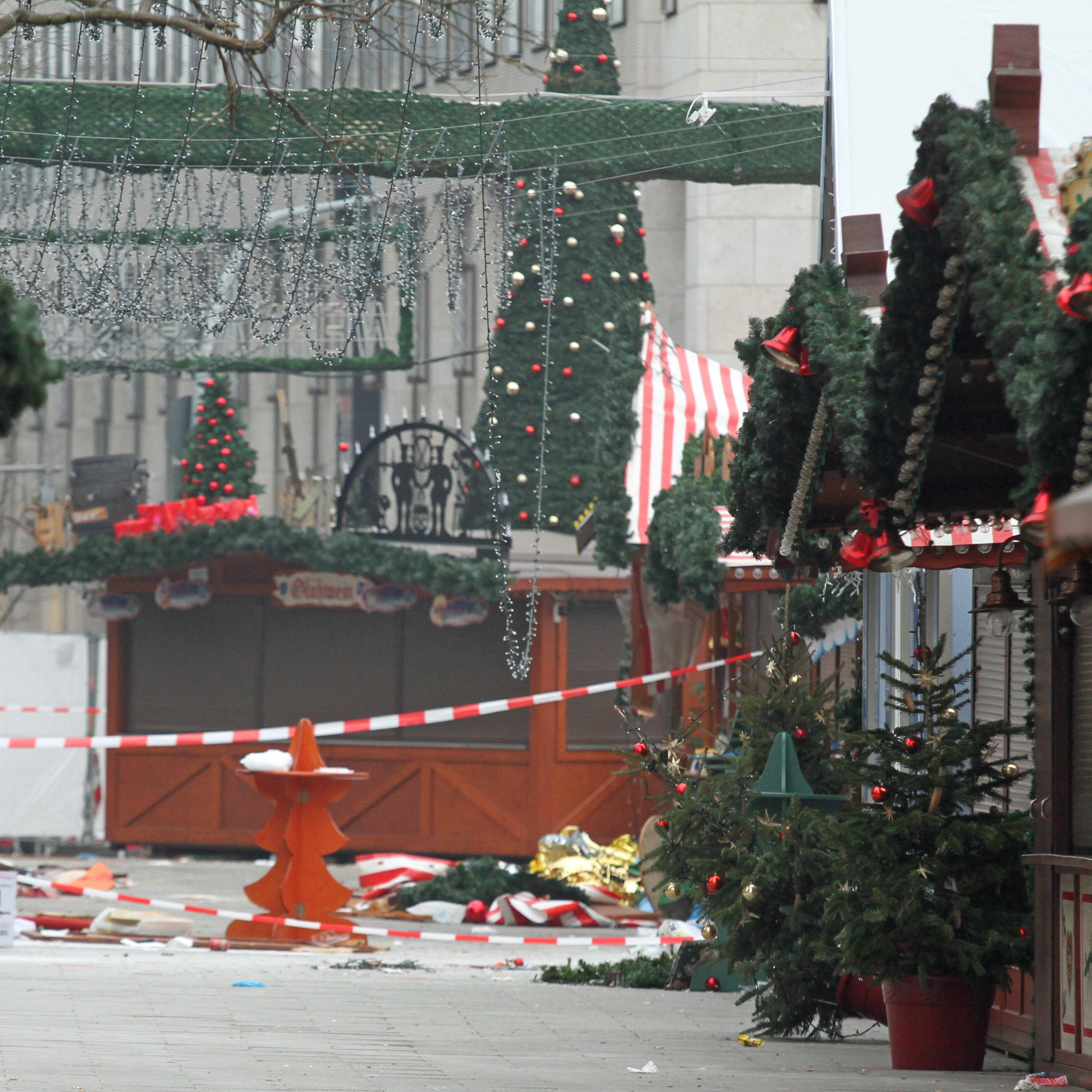
- Aftermath of the attack

- 2016 Berlin truck attack (Berlin) 2016 Berlin truck attack (Germany)
- Native name: Breitscheidplatz-Anschlag
- Location: 52°30′18″N 013°20′08″E; Breitscheidplatz, Berlin, Germany
- Date: 19 December 2016; 9 years ago 20:02 CET (UTC+01)
- Target: Christmas market
- Attack type: Vehicle-ramming attack, truck hijacking, shooting, mass murder
- Weapons: Scania R 450 semi-trailer truck; .22-caliber Erma Model EP552S semi-automatic pistol
- Deaths: 13 (including a victim who died in 2021)
- Injuries: 56
- Perpetrator: Islamic State
- Assailant: Anis Amri
- Motive: Islamic terrorism and retaliation for German support of War against the Islamic State

On 19 December 2016, a truck was deliberately driven into the Christmas market next to the Kaiser Wilhelm Memorial Church at Breitscheidplatz in Berlin, leaving 12 people dead and 56 others injured. One of the victims was the truck's original driver, Łukasz Urban, who was shot dead hours before the attack. The truck was eventually stopped by its automatic brakes. The perpetrator was 24-year-old Anis Amri, an unsuccessful asylum seeker from Tunisia. Four days after the attack, he was killed in a shootout with police near Milan in Italy. An initial suspect was arrested and later released due to lack of evidence. Nearly five years after the attack, a man who was critically injured during the attack died from complications related to his wounds, becoming the 13th victim.

The Islamic State of Iraq and the Levant claimed responsibility for the attack and released a video of the perpetrator, Anis Amri, pledging allegiance to the terror group's leader, Abu Bakr al-Baghdadi. The attack is the deadliest act of terror in Germany since the 1980 Oktoberfest bombing in Munich, which killed 13 people and injured 211 others, and as of December 2023, it remains the worst Islamist terrorist attack by number of casualties in German history.

== Background ==
The Berlin attack took place during a time of heightened Islamist terrorist activity in Europe. Several terrorist attacks in 2016, in Germany and in neighboring countries, have been linked to ISIS; some of them were similar to the truck attack on the Christmas market in Berlin (e.g. the 2014 Nantes attack and the 2016 Nice truck attack, both in France).

== Attack ==
=== Truck hijacking ===
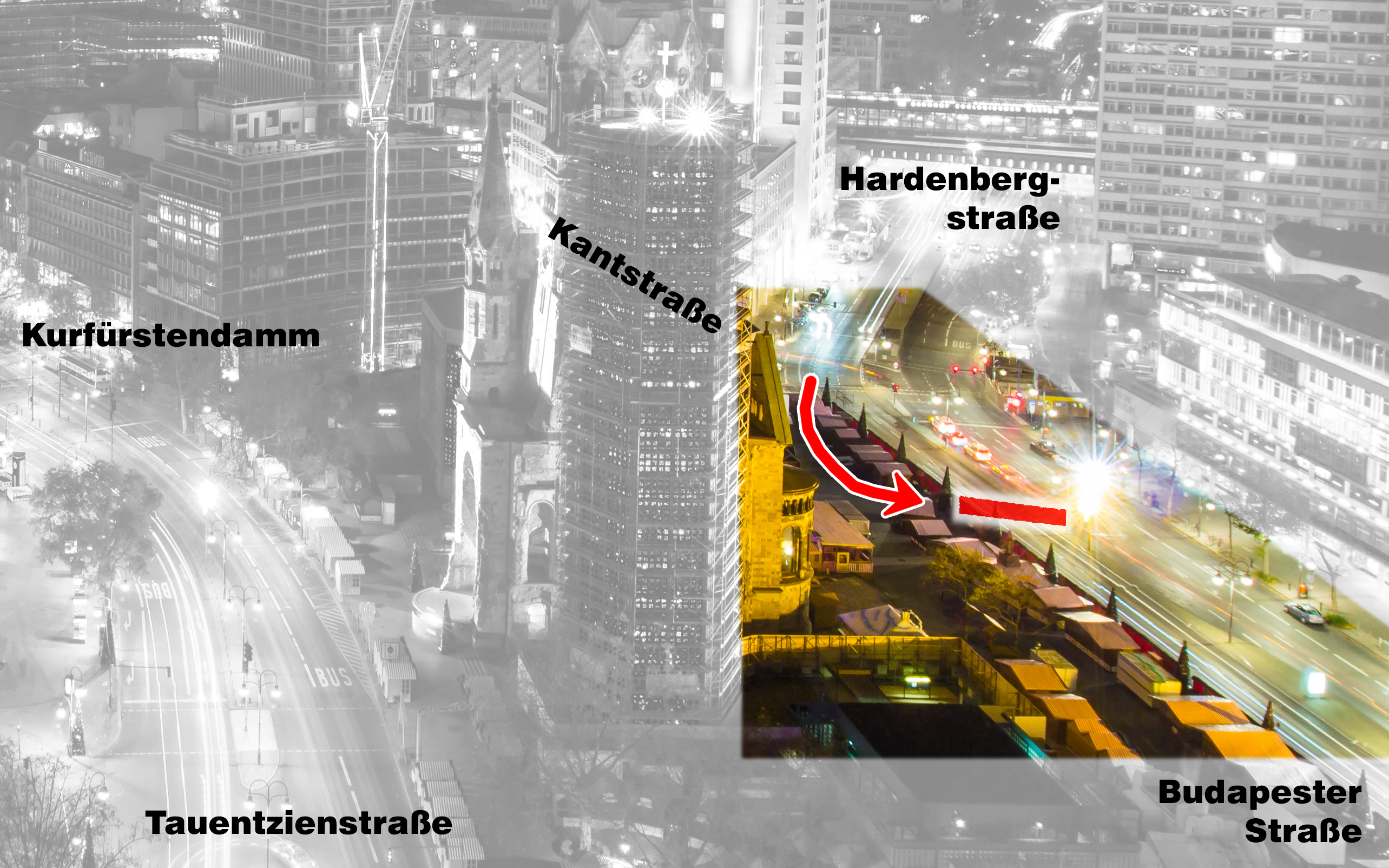
The path of the truck shown on a photograph of the market

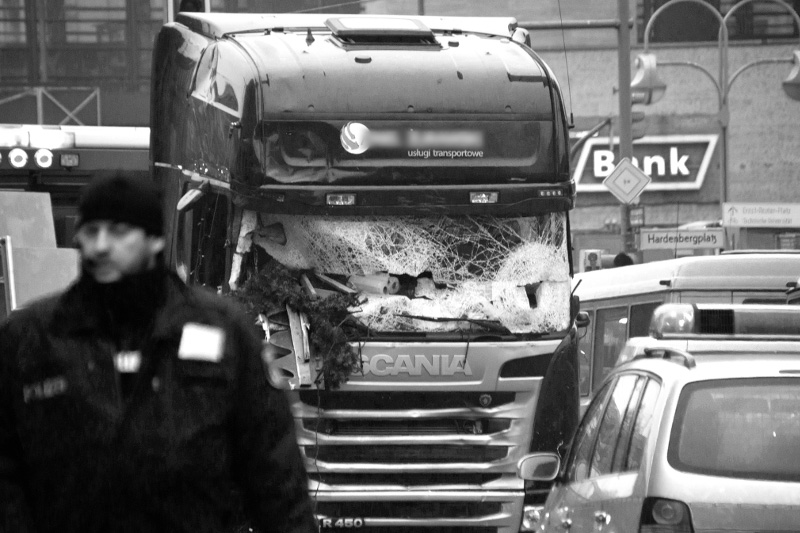
The hijacked semi‑truck involved in the Berlin Christmas market attack at Breitscheidplatz, photographed in the aftermath on 20 December 2016

The vehicle involved, a black Scania R 450 semi-trailer truck, bore Polish number plates and belonged to a Polish delivery company, Usługi Transportowe (Transport Services) Ariel Żurawski, based in Sobiemyśl. The truck was on its return leg to Poland, having started its trip in Turin, Italy, and was transporting steel beams to a Berlin warehouse owned by ThyssenKrupp.

The path of the truck shown on a map

The head of the delivery company, Ariel Żurawski, reported that his cousin, Łukasz Robert Urban, had been driving the truck to Berlin, but that he could not imagine him being responsible for the attack. Żurawski's company last contacted Urban between 15:00 and 16:00, when Urban reported that he had arrived at the Berlin warehouse a day early and had to wait there overnight to unload his truck the following morning. The last photo of Urban still alive was taken at a kebab shop near the ThyssenKrupp warehouse at about 14:00.

The family had been unable to contact Urban since 16:00. Żurawski suspected that the truck had been hijacked based on its GPS coordinates, as well as indications that it was being driven erratically. Żurawski later identified the victim found in the truck as his cousin Urban, the original driver of the semi-trailer; Urban was killed by the perpetrator of the attack. According to a post-mortem examination cited by the German media, Urban was shot in the head between 16:30 and 17:30; initial reports stated that Urban had also been stabbed, but this was revised following the autopsy.

=== Attack on Christmas market ===
On 19 December 2016, at 20:10 local time, the perpetrator drove the stolen truck through a Christmas market at Breitscheidplatz in the City West of Berlin, killing 11 people and injuring 56. The truck came from the direction of Hardenbergstraße, drove about 50 metres (160 ft) through the market, and destroyed several stalls before turning back onto Budapester Straße and coming to a stop level with the Kaiser Wilhelm Memorial Church.

Several witnesses saw the driver leave the truck and flee towards Tiergarten. One witness ran after him.

Łukasz Urban was found dead in the passenger seat of the truck cab. He had been shot once in the head with a small-caliber firearm. Investigators initially believed that Urban might still have been alive when the truck reached Breitscheidplatz and might have been stabbed because he tried to stop the attack. Early media reports speculated that he had grabbed the steering wheel, forcing the truck to veer left and crash to a stop, and was then shot at the scene of the crash. If this had been true, this act might have saved many lives. However, later media reports indicated that the truck was brought to a stop by its automatic braking system and Urban was killed hours before the attack. No weapons were found at the scene.

The Christmas market reopened on 22 December. Damaged stalls were removed and memorials were set up in their stead. Concrete barriers were placed along sides facing streets.

== Victims ==
Twelve people died and at least forty-eight were injured throughout the attack. Many of those injured sustained serious injuries and broken bones from either being hit by the truck, or by the collapse of the wooden stalls that were damaged by the truck. Five years after the attack, a first responder to the attack died in 2021 due to injuries he sustained while responding to victims. It is believed that he was wounded by a beam, sustaining serious head injuries.

Casualties by nationality
Country	Deaths	Injuries	Ref.
Germany	8	Unknown	
Italy	1	3	
Israel	1	1	
Poland	1	0	
Czech Republic	1	0	
Ukraine	1	0	
Spain	0	2	
United Kingdom	0	2	
United States	0	2	
Finland	0	1	
Hungary	0	1	
France	0	1	
Lebanon	0	1	
Unknown	0	42	
Total	13	56	

== Investigation ==
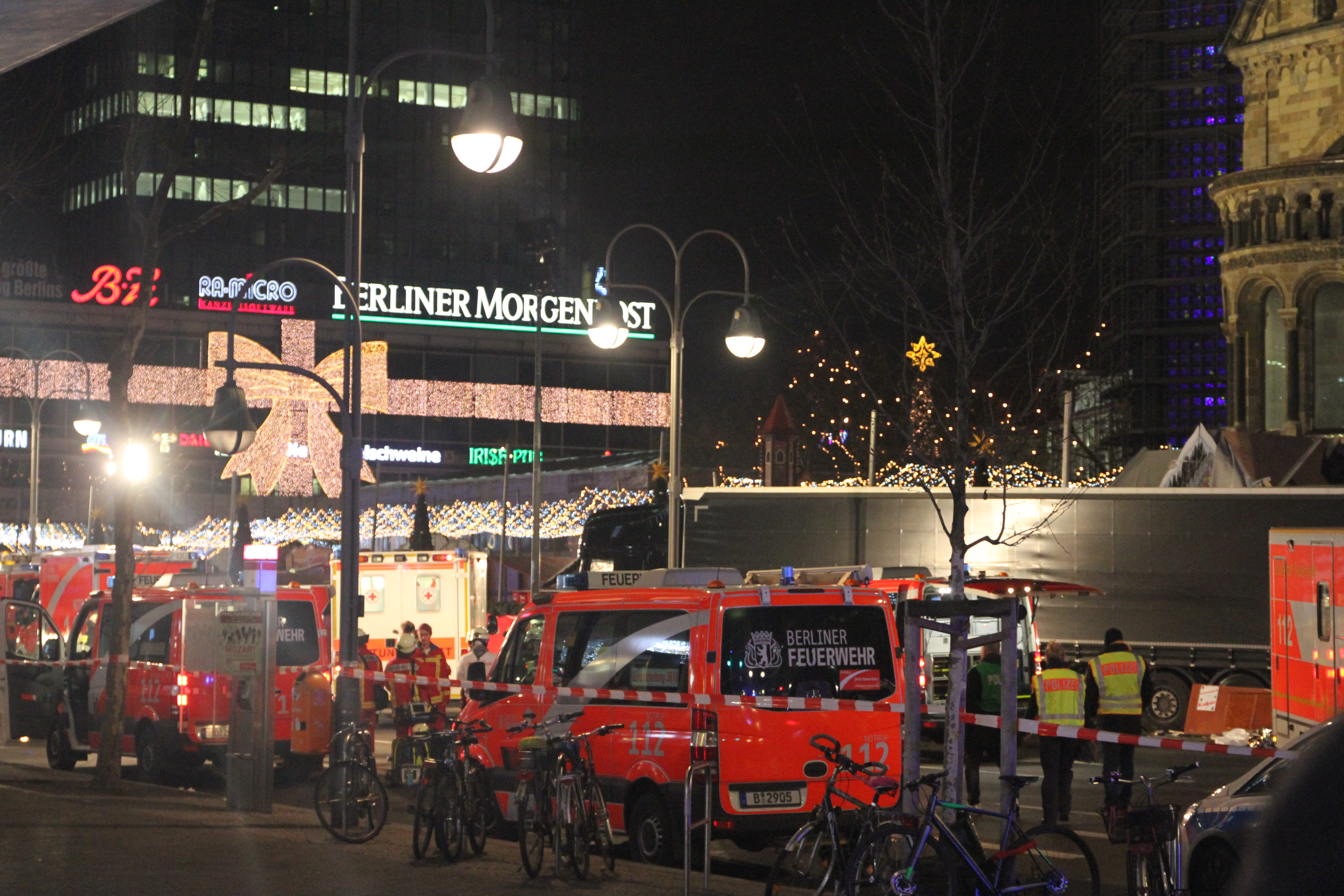
The truck involved, surrounded by emergency vehicles

The police and public prosecutor investigated the incident as a terrorist attack. The Chancellor of Germany, Angela Merkel, said, "We must assume this was a terrorist attack." The German Minister of the Interior, Thomas de Maizière, described the incident as a brutal attack. The U.S. Department of State had previously warned of terrorist attacks on Christmas markets in Europe after ISIL took control of Raqqa and Mosul. ISIL claimed responsibility for the attack shortly after the release of a Pakistani suspect who was mistakenly detained.

=== Initial suspect ===
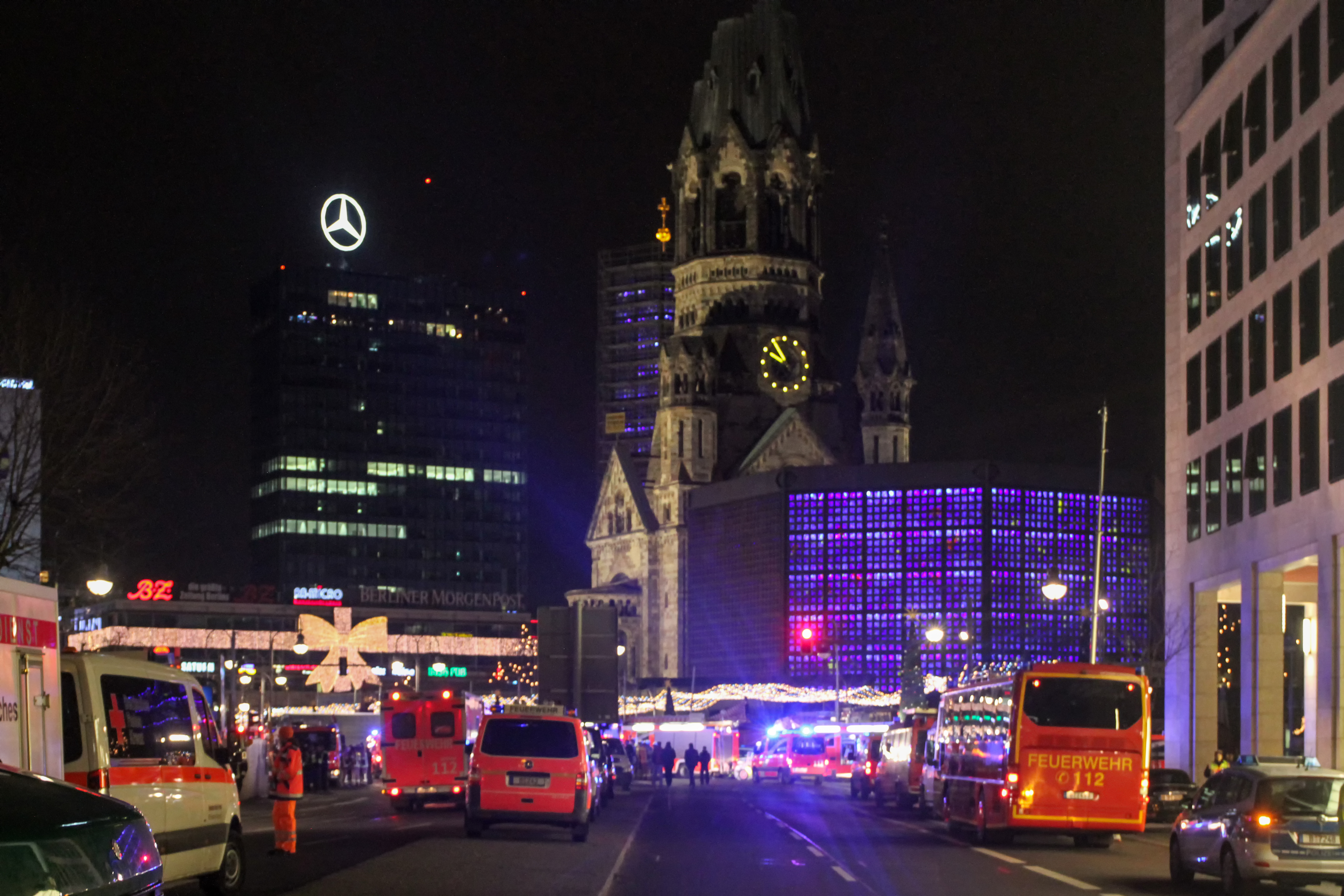
Breitscheidplatz after the attack

On the evening of 19 December, police arrested a suspect, believed to have driven the truck during the attack, near the Berlin Victory Column. He had aroused suspicion by running away from the scene of the attack out of fear that he would be considered a suspect. The arrested man, initially identified only as Naved B. (later said to be Naved Baloch by the British newspaper The Guardian), denied involvement and was later identified as a 23-year-old asylum seeker from Turbat, Pakistan. The Berlin SEK police tactical unit stormed the hangar at the former Berlin Tempelhof Airport, which is used as a refugee camp, where the arrested man lived with six others in a room. His mobile phone was seized and analyzed. Police sources later suggested that they might have arrested "the wrong man" because the individual in custody did not carry gunshot residue or any marks that would indicate that he had been in a fight. Furthermore, forensic tests did not indicate that the suspect was inside the cab of the truck. Police therefore believed that the attacker might still be at large.

German Public Prosecutor General Peter Frank said, "We have to get used to the idea that the man apprehended may not be the perpetrator or belong to the group of perpetrators." The man was released on the evening of 20 December due to lack of evidence.

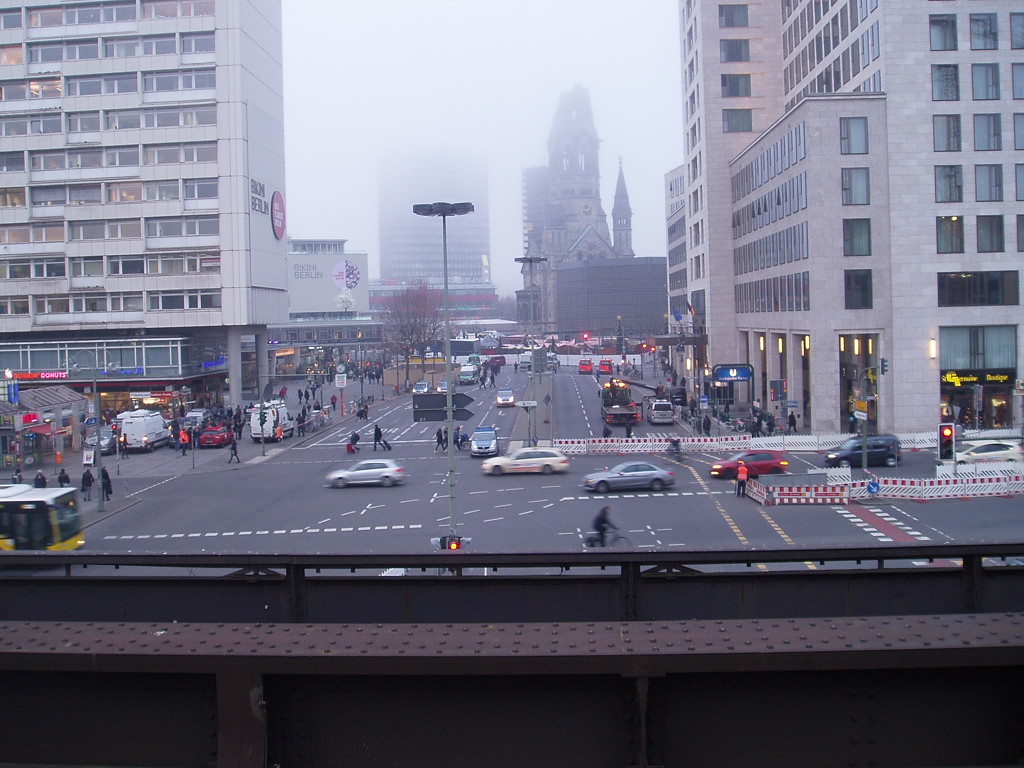
Hardenbergstrasse the day after; street taken by the truck straight into the Christmas market.

In an interview with The Guardian on 29 December, he narrated the incident of his arrest on 19 December. According to him, after leaving a friend's house and crossing a road in central Berlin on the evening of the attack, a car started following him, after which he walked faster. When he realised that it was a police car, he stopped when they asked him to and showed his identification documents to them. He was allowed to go, but was called back seconds later and arrested. He claimed that he was tied up, blindfolded and also slapped by the police after refusing to undress for photographs. He said in the interview that he had gone into hiding, fearing for his life. The Guardian also said he had applied for asylum in Germany as a member of a secular separatist movement in Balochistan province of Pakistan.

=== Anis Amri ===
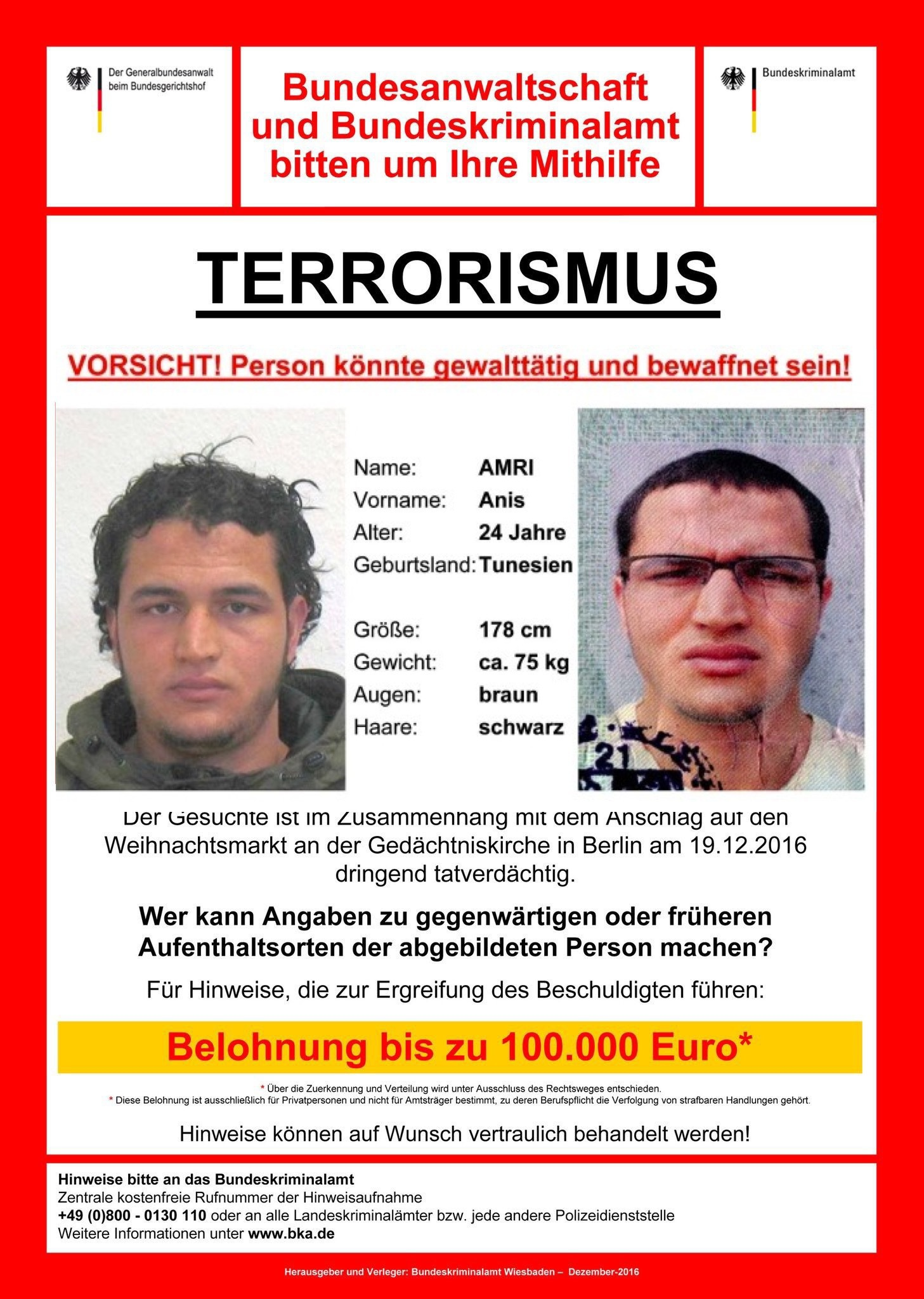
Wanted poster offering a reward for Amri

On 21 December, police announced that investigators had found, under the truck's driver's seat, a suspension of deportation permit belonging to Anis Amri. Amri was born in Tataouine, Tunisia on 22 December 1992. Authorities began a Europe-wide search for Amri. According to investigators, Amri entered Germany from Italy in 2015 and had contacts with the network of the recently arrested Salafist preacher Abu Walaa, a known ISIL recruiter in Germany. Amri was sought by the Federal Criminal Police Office. Officials called for a public manhunt, issuing a recent picture, and offering a reward of €100,000, warning that Amri might be armed and dangerous. He was described as being 178 cm (5 ft 10 in) tall, weighing approximately 75 kilograms (165 lb), with dark hair and brown eyes.

Amri fled from Tunisia to escape imprisonment for stealing a truck and arrived for the first time in Europe in 2011 on a refugee raft at the island of Lampedusa. He lied about his age, pretending to be a minor, and was sent to the temporary migrants reception center on the island. At the center, according to Italian security officials, Amri "took part in a particularly violent riot, when the center was set on fire and several people were injured" and was sentenced for it and robbery to four years in prison, which he served in two jails in Sicily. Amri was released in 2015; according to Italian officials, the Tunisian authorities refused to accept his repatriation to Tunisia, and it is believed that he went to Germany around this time. Per an autopsy on his body, it was found that he frequently consumed drugs.

In Tunisia, Amri was sentenced in absentia to five years in prison, "reportedly for aggravated theft with violence". Prior to that he had been arrested several times for possession and use of drugs. According to his family, he drank alcohol, took drugs and was initially not religious, but had been radicalized in Italian jails. He arrived in Germany in July 2015 and applied for asylum in April 2016. He used at least 14 different aliases and posed as a citizen of Syria, Egypt or Lebanon. He reportedly had tried to recruit participants for a terrorist attack since the spring, and once tried to buy a pistol from an undercover police officer. He had been overheard by German intelligence offering to carry out a suicide attack, but the German authorities had decided not to arrest him because they deemed him a mere errand boy. The German CID warned in March 2016 that he was planning a suicide attack and recommended immediate deportation. However, the state government of North Rhine-Westphalia ruled that he could not be deported. In Germany he was involved in a bar brawl and drug dealing; later he was involved in a knife attack over drugs in July 2016 and disappeared after police tried to question him. Three weeks before the attack, Moroccan intelligence warned Germany about the terrorist attack planned by him. He had started spending more time in Berlin before the attack and was being closely monitored, but showed no signs of planning a terrorist attack, according to a report submitted by the German Interior Minister to the state parliament of North Rhine-Westphalia. German authorities were seeking to deport him at the time of the attack, but the legal requirements had not been met because Tunisia initially denied that Amri was their citizen, although documents confirming it arrived in Germany after the attack.

A few minutes after the attack, a surveillance camera spotted him at Berlin Zoologischer Garten railway station which is close to the Christmas market. At the station, he turned to the camera and raised a finger, a gesture commonly used by Islamists. He later left Germany, travelling to the Netherlands, Belgium and France before reaching Italy. On 23 December at around 03:00 CET, Amri was killed in a shootout with police in front of the railway station in Sesto San Giovanni near Milan. He had just arrived by train from Chambéry, France (via Turin). During a routine patrol, two police officers asked to search his backpack after he said he did not have any identity documents. Amri pulled out a gun and shot one of the officers in the shoulder; the other officer shot Amri dead. The Italian Minister of the Interior, Marco Minniti, stated that a policeman had been hospitalized with a shoulder injury. On the same day, Amaq released a video of Amri pledging allegiance to Abu Bakr al-Baghdadi, the leader of ISIL. German officials confirmed that Amri's fingerprints matched those found in the inside of the truck.

On 28 December, German prosecutors said they had detained a 40-year-old Tunisian man, who they thought may have been involved in the attack. Amri had saved the number of this man in his phone. Prosecutors stated the next day that he had been released after investigations revealed that he was not a suspected contact of Amri. They also confirmed that the attacker had sent a mobile phone voice message and a picture to a contact shortly before carrying out the attack. The German police raided the homes of two suspected associates on 3 January 2017, including a 26-year-old Tunisian man they suspected of being in contact with Amri and knowing about the attack as well as a former flatmate of Amri. The Tunisian suspect who was suspected of either planning the attack or knowing about it was detained with federal prosecutors stating that he had known Amri since the end of 2015, had met him a day before the attack and both had "very intense conversations". Amri's former flatmate was also being investigated and the attacker had tried to contact him twice on 19 December.

Italian police confirmed on 4 January that the gun used in the attack, a .22-caliber Erma Model EP552S pistol (Walther PPK clone), matched the one found on Amri. ZDF reported on 6 January that he might have acquired the gun in Switzerland and lived there for a prolonged period of time whose length investigators were trying to determine. Swiss prosecutors meanwhile opened a case related to the attack. The Office of the Attorney General of Switzerland later confirmed that he had spent some time in the country while the German police were investigating whether the gun was acquired by him there. Investigators stated on 18 January that the gun was imported legally into Switzerland in the 1990s, but it remained unclear what happened to it afterwards as it didn't appear in the weapons registers of cantons of Switzerland and there was no national weapons register at the time.

On 24 December, Tunisian authorities arrested three men suspected of terrorist links including Amri's nephew. They stated that Amri had urged his nephew to join ISIL and had sent him money to travel to Europe. Tunisian Interior Ministry stated that he had also told him that he was the emir or leader of a German jihadist group called "Abu al-Walaa brigade". Another person was announced to have been arrested on 7 January in Tunisia in relation to the case. However all four were released on the next day as they weren't found to have links to the attack or any terrorist group.

Italy's Interior Ministry announced on 12 March that it had deported a 37-year-old Tunisian man whose telephone number was in Amri's contact list. The ministry stated that he had been in contact with the attacker and his number was also linked to a Facebook profile supporting jihadist ideology where he connected with supporters of ISIL. It added that he was living in Latina where he associated with fellow extremists who opposed a moderate imam at a local mosque. In late-March, Turkey arrested more than six men allegedly linked to Amri.

=== Amri's friends ===
Six individuals including some friends of Amri's were arrested on 8 April 2018 for planning a knife attack on a sports event in Berlin. The main suspect was under police surveillance. They were all released after no evidence was found that they were planning a terror attack.

=== Defective investigation and obstruction of justice ===
On 17 May 2017 the Interior Ministry of Berlin stated that already in November 2016 intelligence was given that Anis Amri was involved in criminal offenses concerning drug trafficking. On this basis authorities would have been able to apprehend Amri already at the time, but they did not. An investigation was launched to find out to what extent this information was withheld by the State Criminal Police Office of Berlin after the attack happened. Several days later, while the investigation for obstruction of justice was still going on, a speaker of the Interior Ministry said that manipulations of the file of Amri have been carried out by officers of the criminal investigation department after the attack. On 22 May 2017 a commission of inquiry was initiated starting in July. Meanwhile, a special prosecutor was appointed to the case. In addition to the ongoing investigation concerning manipulations of the file and withholding of information, national TV reported on 1 June, that officers who were ordered by an investigating judge in Berlin to observe Amri until October 2016 for criminal offenses and possible terrorist links did not do so and instead included untrue records regarding observing actions in his file.

== Reactions ==
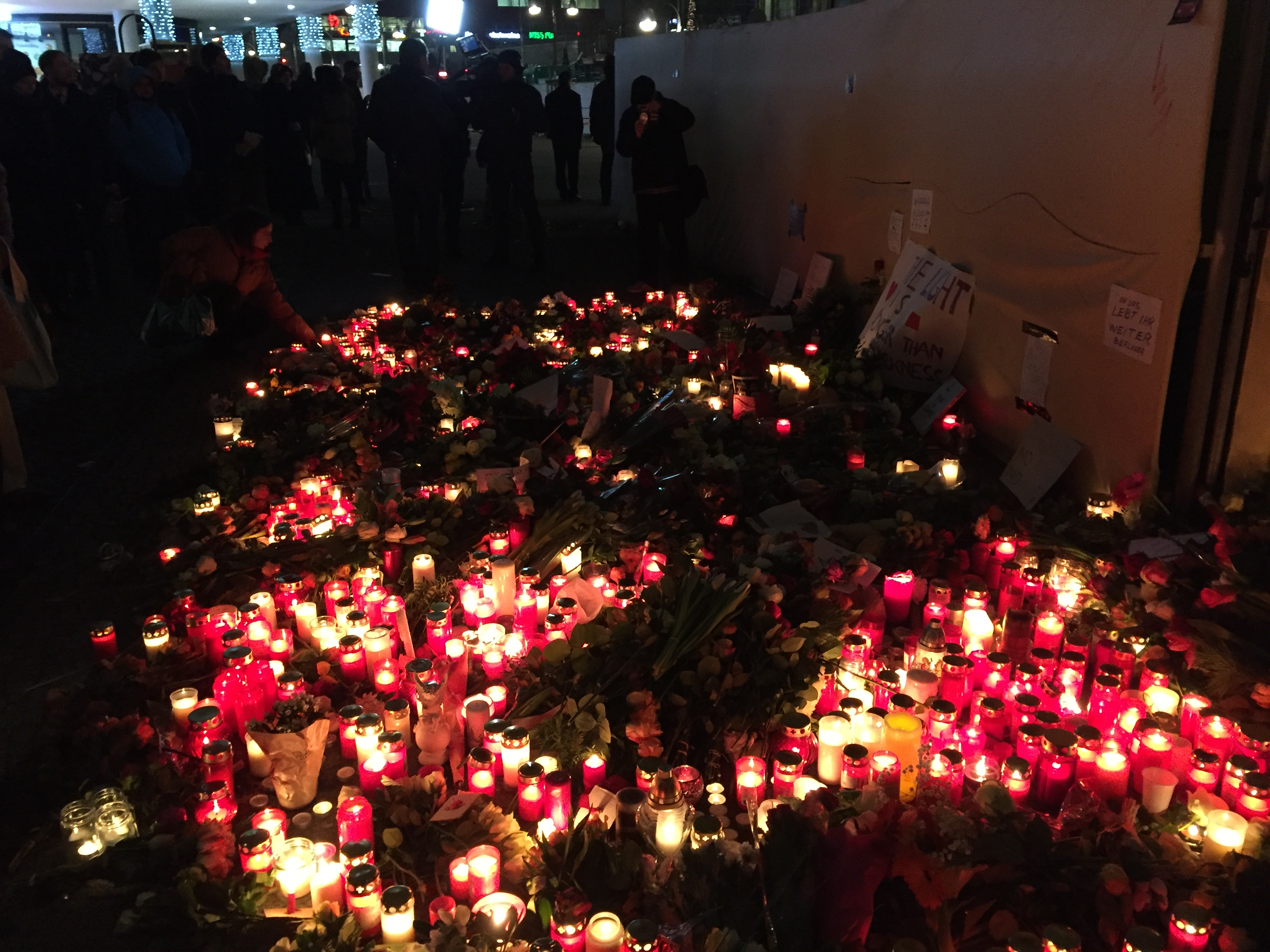
Candlelight memorial near the scene of the attack

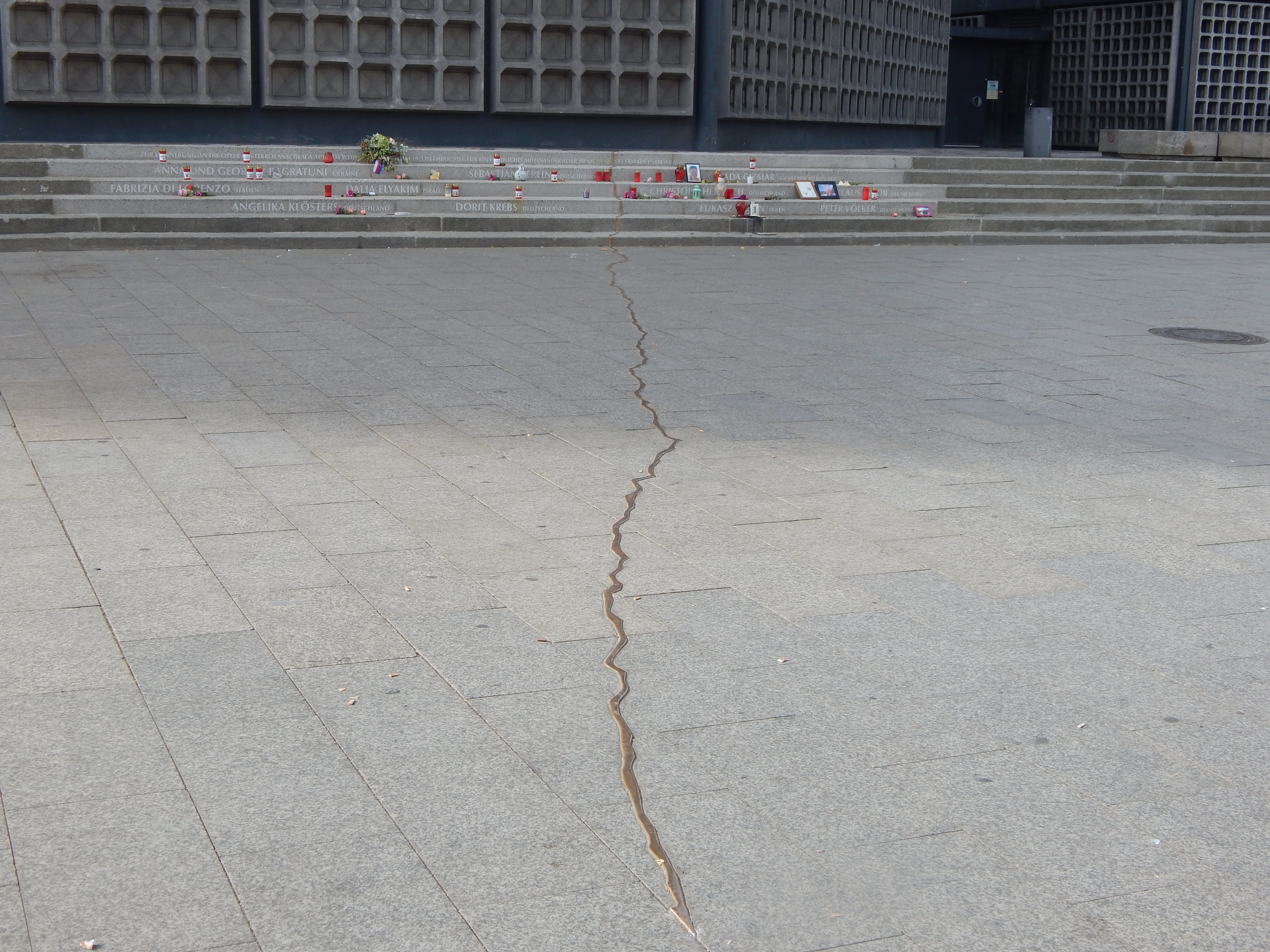
"Goldener Riss" memorial as of 2018, marking where the truck came to a stop

Many world leaders offered condolences to Germany and the victims of the attack.

National and international right-wing politicians and commentators blamed the attack partly on German Chancellor Angela Merkel and her policy of accepting an unlimited number of asylum seekers and migrants. Euroskeptic politicians also condemned the lack of border checks under the Schengen system for allowing the perpetrator to travel freely through several countries after the attack. By contrast, several other national and international political commentators praised what they described as the cool-headed reaction of the Merkel administration. The editorial board of The New York Times wrote that it was "dangerous" to blame German refugee policy without waiting for facts about the identity of the attacker to emerge.

A petition to award Urban the Bundesverdienstkreuz had gathered over 2,500 signatures by the afternoon of 22 December. A donation page to support his family was set up on GoFundMe and collected more than €110,000 by 23 December by British truck driver Dave Duncan. He was officially thanked by Polish Ambassador to the United Kingdom Arkady Rzegocki at a ceremony at Embassy of Poland, London on 9 January 2017. Polish authorities provided funds for the delivery of Urban to his family as well as the costs of the funeral and the family of Urban received a state pension. German authorities refused to reimburse the value of the destroyed truck which belonged to a company run by Urban's cousin.

Muslims and Christians in Berlin held a vigil in solidarity with the victims of the attack. The funeral of Urban was held on 30 December at the Polish village of Banie and was attended by hundreds of people including President of Poland Andrzej Duda.

The German government reformed its security rules in response to the attack. Among the proposals in the anti-terror plan were easing the deportations of rejected asylum seekers, increasing surveillance of those to be deported and those considered to be terror risks, limiting movement of some asylum seekers within Germany, using electronic tags on those deemed terror threats without a trial, lengthening the period suspects can be held in custody and limiting development aid to countries that don't cooperate in deportation processes. President of Tunisia Beji Caid Essebsi meanwhile stated that Europe "must be calm", vowing to take responsibility for the attacks, but insisted that it was necessary to verify citizenship before accepting deportations. The Bundestag passed a new surveillance law on 9 March in response to the attack as well as other attacks that occurred in Germany in 2016. The law gives priority to public safety when deciding on whether to permit installation of video surveillance in some locations and makes it easier for private companies to install these systems in public places. It also voted for allowing the Federal Police to install surveillance systems for reading and registering licence plate numbers.

== Aftermath ==
In February 2017, the German Salafist mosque organisation Berliner Fussilet-Moscheeverein was banned by authorities. Amri was said to be among its visitors. In March 2017, the German Muslim community organisation Deutschsprachige Islamkreis Hildesheim was also banned after investigators found that its members were preparing to travel to the conflict zone in Syria to fight for the Islamic State. According to the Federal Agency for Civic Education, these examples show that Salafist mosques not only concern themselves with religious matters, but also prepare serious crimes and terrorist activities.

In preparation for the Christmas market 2018, the Breitscheidplatz square and its surrounding were fortified against further terrorist attacks.

On the fourth anniversary in December 2020, a ceremony, which was attended by survivors and relatives of the victims, was held at the Breitscheidplatz to commemorate those killed in the attack. The archbishop of Berlin Heiner Koch said in his prayers that Berlin "was not the same as before".

== Timeline of events ==
A map of Amri's movements in the days following the attack
- 19 December 2016 – Polish lorry driver Łukasz Urban, 37, has his vehicle hijacked in the heart of Berlin.
  - Shortly after 20:00 local time – The hijacked truck veers into a traditional Christmas market in the shadow of the Kaiser Wilhelm Memorial Church. Eleven people are killed, Urban is found stabbed and shot dead in the cabin. Shortly after the attack, a 23-year-old Pakistani asylum-seeker is arrested nearby based on a description by a witness who had attempted to chase the attacker but lost sight of him.
- 20 December 2016 – Following 24 hours of confusion, the Pakistani suspect is released by police as no evidence could be found that would link the man to the attack. Police state they believe the actual attacker to still be at large, possibly armed and dangerous.
- 21 December 2016 – Anis Amri, a Tunisian man with connections to ISIL, whose asylum request to Germany had been rejected, is announced as the new chief suspect after his documents were reportedly found in the wreckage of the hijacked lorry. He is said to have been using six different names under three different nationalities. Later in the day, a reward of up to €100,000 (£85,000) is offered by German authorities for information leading to Amri's arrest. The country's security is placed under fresh scrutiny following revelations that covert surveillance of the 24-year-old Amri had been discontinued after more than six months, due to police finding nothing to substantiate an initial tip-off.
- 19–22 December 2016 – Amri likely travelled to Nijmegen, the Netherlands, where it is thought he took a bus to the Lyon-Part-Dieu train station in France. He then took a train from Lyon, via Chambéry, France, to Milan, Italy, via the Italian city of Turin.
- 22 December 2016 – Amri's brother Abdelkader urges Amri to turn himself in, adding that his family "dissociate" themselves from him. The spokeswoman for Germany's federal prosecutor office announces that the fingerprints of Amri had been discovered on the outside of the truck, the driver's door and the vertical support beam in its window area.
- 23 December 2016 –
  - 1 am – Amri arrives at the Central Station of Milan, Italy, via Turin.
  - 3 am – Italian Police on a routine patrol in Sesto San Giovanni spot a "very suspicious" male walking through the city center. After being approached by the officers and asked to provide identification documents, the man draws a fire-arm from his backpack and begins shooting. In the ensuing shootout one police officer is injured and the suspect, later identified as Amri, is killed.
  - 10 am – Italian interior minister Marco Minniti holds a morning press conference to announce, with "no doubt", that Italian police had shot and killed the Berlin terrorism suspect. Amaq releases a video of Amri pledging allegiance to ISIL during the day.
- 29 December 2016 – Prosecutors confirm the attacker sent a voice message and a picture to a contact before the attack.
- 4 January 2017 – A 26-year-old Tunisian man who knew Amri since late 2015 and met him a day before the attack is detained. German police state they are investigating him as well as Amri's former flatmate. Italian police confirm gun used in attack matches the one on Amri.
- 10 March 2017 – Italian Interior Ministry announces that it has deported a 37-year-old Tunisian man linked to Amri.
- 19 September 2018 – Italian authorities deported a Tunisian imam who had been sentenced to jail for armed robbery and drug trafficking. He had spread radical propaganda in the prison and celebrated the actions of Amri in the prison located in Rebibbia. He was moved from the prison to a detention centre and then put on a plane to Cairo.

== See also ==
- List of Islamist terrorist attacks
- List of massacres in Germany
- List of terrorist incidents in December 2016
- Terrorism in Europe
  - Terrorism in France
  - Terrorism in Germany
- 2018 Münster attack
- 2018-2019 Bottrop and Essen car attack
- 2020 Volkmarsen attack
- 2020 Trier attack
- 2021 Waukesha Christmas parade attack, vehicle-ramming attack at a Christmas parade in Waukesha, Wisconsin.
- 2022 Berlin car attack
- 2024 Magdeburg car attack
- 2026 Berlin Pride attack
