= Die Wahre Religion =

Islamist Salafi organization in Germany

Die Wahre Religion (DWR, in English "The True Religion") was an Islamist Salafi organisation based in Germany that was founded in 2005 by Palestinian-born German Salafist Ibrahim Abou-Nagie. The organization is thought to have had around 500 active members. Die wahre Religion takes part in Koran distribution campaigns. The declared goal of the campaign under the name Lies! (meaning Read! in German) is to provide a Quran translation to every household in Germany. According to the founder, around 3.5 million copies were distributed by mid-2016. The organization was successfully banned in November 2016 by the German government following its proven recruitment of jihadists to fight in Syria and Iraq for the Islamic State of Iraq and the Levant, also known as ISIS.

== Ibrahim Abou-Nagie ==
Die wahre Religion's founder is Gaza-born Palestinian Ibrahim Abou-Nagie (Arabic: إبراهيم أبو ناجي), an immigrant Salafist preacher. He arrived in Germany in 1982 as an 18-year-old and claims to have run successful businesses, although those claims have not been substantiated. He became a German citizen in 1984. He describes a religious awakening in 2003 after which he became a preacher. Abou-Nagie promoted the idea of distributing Qurans to German passers-by. Abou-Nagie has been known to German security officials since 2005, the year he created a website described by officials as spreading extremist propaganda.

Abou-Nagie was alleged to have openly preached against democracy and other Western values, in a video proclaiming "Democracy is against Islam. And it is the opposite of Islam." He also opined that "If someone is married and commits adultery, he must be stoned." Abou Nagie has also said that homosexuals must be executed in order to "protect Muslims," and proclaimed that "disbelievers" will burn in hell. An attempt to prosecute Abou-Nagie on charges of incitement of religious hatred failed in 2012.

== Quran distribution campaign ==
The group's most well-known activity is a campaign of distributing Qurans published in German in Germany and also in Austria and German-speaking areas in Switzerland. The campaign is known in German as Lies! (German for Read!) and is active in several countries including the United Kingdom, France, Bahrain and Brazil under the general Arabic language name Iqraa! (اقرأ in Arabic). The word is derived from اقرأ باسم ربّك الّذي خلق (pronounced Iqraa' bismi rabbika allathi khalaq, meaning Read in the name of your God that created).

== November 2016 raids and ban ==
The arrest on 8 November 2016 of Abu Walaa, a 32 year old Iraqi-born Hildesheim-based Salafi preacher, heralded a nationwide police crack down in Germany the following week on Islamist organizations including Die Wahre Religion. Beginning on November 15, 2016, German authorities conducted raids on 190 locations across the nation, thought to be linked to extremism. The police raids spanned ten cities and regions, including Die Wahre Religion offices in Berlin, Hamburg, Bremen, Bavaria, Baden-Württemberg and North Rhine-Westphalia. securing material used in the promotion of "violent jihad."

According to German government sources, 140 of Die Wahre Religion members are known to have traveled to Iraq or Syria to fight for ISIS. Ibrahim Abou-Nagie, the founder of the organization was out of the country at the time of the raids.

DWR was banned by German authorities in November 2016. The Koran translation used by the group has been described as a "particularly hardline interpretation," while the group itself, in response to being banned, claimed that this meant the Koran had been banned in Germany. The group continues to be active in the UK and abroad after being banned in Germany.
