= Herbert Reul =

German politician of the Christian Democratic Union (born 1952)

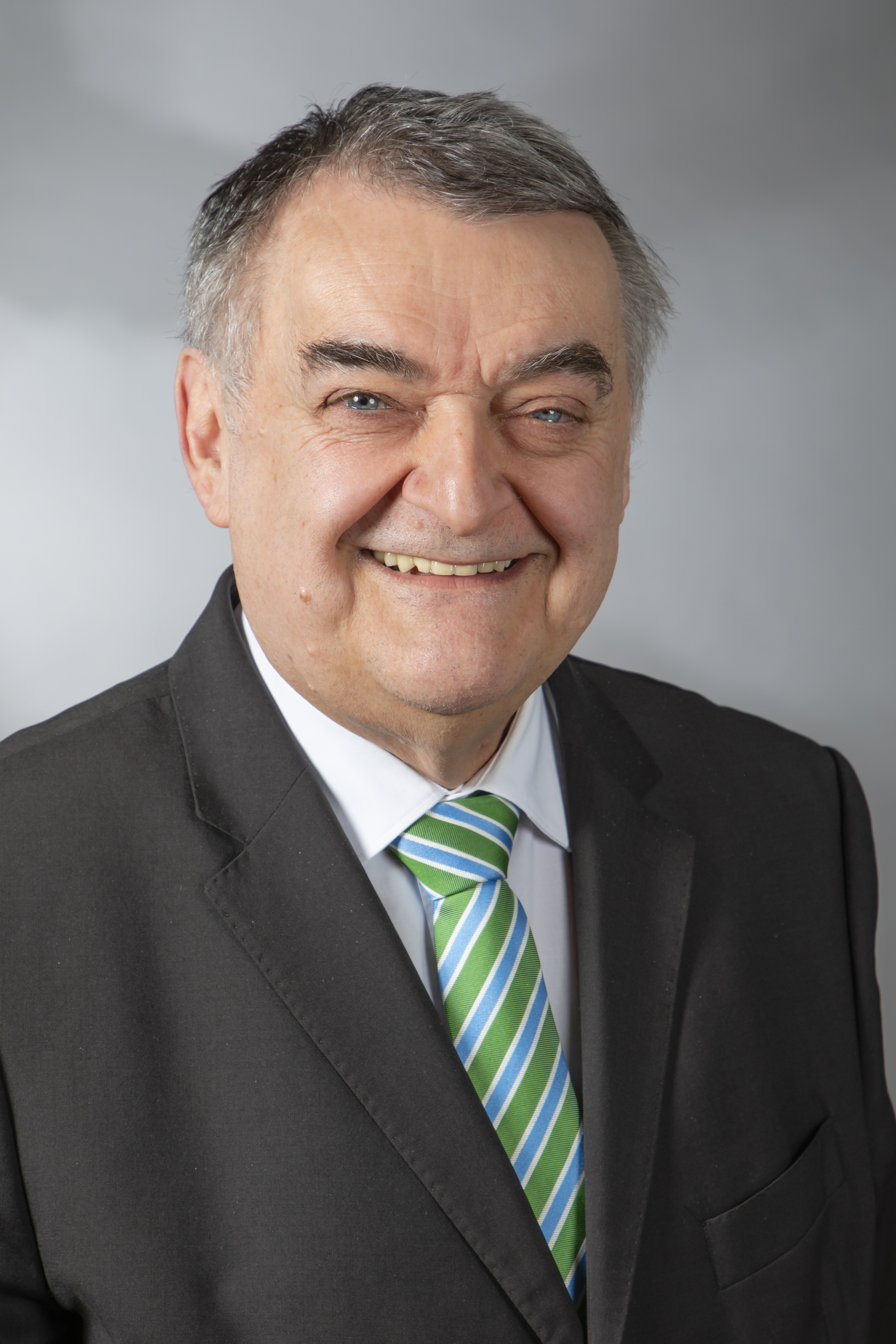
- Reul in 2019

Minister of the Interior of North Rhine-Westphalia
- Incumbent
- Assumed office 30 June 2017
- Prime Minister: Armin Laschet; Hendrik Wüst
- Preceded by: Ralf Jäger

Member of the European Parliament
- In office 1 July 2004 – 6 July 2017
- Constituency: Germany

Personal details
- Born: 7 August 1952 (age 74) Langenfeld, Rhineland, West Germany
- Party: German: Christian Democratic Union; EU: European People's Party
- Education: University of Cologne
- Website: www.herbert-reul.de

Herbert Reul (born 31 August 1952) is a German politician of the Christian Democratic Union (CDU) who has been serving as State Minister for Internal Affairs in the government of successive Ministers-President Armin Laschet (2017–2021) and Hendrik Wüst (since 2021). He previously served as a Member of the European Parliament (MEP).

== Early career ==
Reul was born in Langenfeld, Rhineland. The son of a mayor, Reul joined the youth wing of the CDU, the Junge Union, at the age of 18. In 1975, while still a student at University of Cologne, he became a town councillor in his hometown of Leichlingen, near Cologne, and served for 17 years. From 1981 until 1985, he worked as a secondary school teacher.

== Political career ==
=== Career in state politics, 1985–2003 ===
In the 1985 state elections, Reul gained a seat in the State Parliament of North Rhine-Westphalia and occupied it for 19 years. In parliament, he was his political group's spokesperson on education policy from 1985 to 1991. Between 1991 and 2003, he served as Secretary General of the CDU in North Rhine-Westphalia, under the leadership of successive chairmen Norbert Blüm (1993–99) and Jürgen Rüttgers (1999–2003).

=== Member of the European Parliament, 2004–2017 ===
Reul first became a Member of the European Parliament in the 2004 European elections. During his time in parliament, he was a member of the Committee on Industry, Research and Energy. Between 2006 and 2009, he also served as the energy spokesman for the German Christian Democrats’ delegation in the European People's Party in the Parliament.

From 2012, Reul was a member of the European Parliament's delegation for relations with the Korean Peninsula. He had previously been a member of the delegation for relations with the People's Republic of China between 2004 and 2012.

In addition to his committee assignments, Reul was a member of the European Parliament Intergroup on Long Term Investment and Reindustrialisation, the Sky and Space Intergroup (SSI) and the European Parliament Intergroup on Climate Change, Biodiversity and Sustainable Development.

Reul was widely regarded as one of the driving forces behind blocking Martin Schulz’ reelection as President of the European Parliament in early 2017.

=== State Minister for Internal Affairs, 2017–present ===
From the North Rhine-Westphalia state elections in 2017, Reul served as State Minister for Internal Affairs in the government of Minister-President Armin Laschet. He succeeded Ralf Jäger. As one of his state's representatives at the Bundesrat, he is a member of the Committee on Internal Affairs and of the Defence Committee.

During his time in office, Reul oversaw investigations into the 2018 Münster attack and the Bottrop and Essen car attack in 2018/2019. In 2020, he ordered an investigation into police officers’ use of force following a public outcry over a video of a police officer detaining a minor by kneeling on his neck.

Since 2021, Reul has been serving as deputy chair of the CDU in North Rhine-Westphalia, under the leadership of chair Hendrik Wüst. That same year, he announced his intention to run for a seat in the State Parliament of North Rhine-Westphalia in the 2022 state elections.

=== Role in national politics ===
Reul was a CDU delegate to the Federal Convention for the purpose of electing the President of Germany in 1994, 1999, 2004, 2009, 2010, 2017 and 2022. Since 2012, he has been serving on the Presidium of the CDU, under the leadership of successive chairs Angela Merkel (2012–2018), Annegret Kramp-Karrenbauer (2018–2021) and Armin Laschet (2021). In the negotiations to form a Grand Coalition of Merkel's Christian Democrats (CDU) together with the Bavarian CSU) and the Social Democrats (SPD) following the 2013 German elections, he led the CDU/CSU delegation in the working group on banking regulation and the Eurozone; his co-chair from the SPD was Martin Schulz.

Together with Frank Henkel, Peter Hintze, Annegret Kramp-Karrenbauer, Christine Lieberknecht, David McAllister and Annette Widmann-Mauz, Reul co-chaired the CDU's 2014 national convention in Berlin.

Ahead of the Christian Democrats’ leadership election in 2018, Reul publicly endorsed Annegret Kramp-Karrenbauer to succeed Angela Merkel as the party's chair.

== Other activities ==
=== Corporate boards ===
- RheinEnergie AG, Member of the supervisory board (2012–2014), Member of the advisory board (since 2014)

=== Non-profits ===
- German Forum for Crime Prevention (DFK), Ex-Officio Member of the Board of Trustees (since 2017)
- Institute of Energy Economics at the University of Cologne, Member of the advisory board (since 2016)
- Institute for European Politics (IEP), Member of the Board of Trustees (since 2015)
- Konrad Adenauer Foundation, Member
- Karl Arnold Foundation, Member of the Board
- Karl Reul Foundation, Member of the Advisory Board
- Max Planck Institute for Biology of Ageing, Member of the Board of Trustees (since 2015)
- Institute for Mining and Energy Law at the Ruhr University Bochum, Member of the advisory board (since 2013)
- Westdeutscher Rundfunk (WDR), Member of the Broadcasting Council (2003–2009), Substitute Member of the Broadcasting Council (since 2009)

== Controversy ==
Shortly after the CDU donations scandal and amid the campaign for the state elections in 2000, Reul became the target of public criticism when he – in his capacity as Secretary General of the CDU in North Rhine-Westphalia – had his party pay for a private trip to the Bayreuth Festival.
