= Bottrop and Essen car attack =

2019 car attack in Germany

- Bottrop and Essen car attack (North Rhine-Westphalia)
- Location: Bottrop and Essen, Germany
- Date: 31 December 2018 – 1 January 2019; 11:45 p.m. – 12:17 p.m. (CET)
- Target: People of foreign heritage
- Attack type: Vehicular attack
- Weapon: Silver Mercedes-Benz car
- Deaths: 0
- Injuries: 14
- Assailant: Andreas N.
- Motive: acute episode of paranoid schizophrenia

On the night of 31 December 2018 to 1 January 2019, a series of vehicle-ramming attacks took place in the cities of Bottrop and Essen, North Rhine-Westphalia, Germany. A 50-year-old man intentionally drove his car into crowds of pedestrians in four locations, injuring fourteen people.

Most of the injured victims had a migration background and the perpetrator told police he had deliberately targeted people he perceived as "refugees". Initial investigations suspected a terrorist background for the attacks.

During court proceedings for attempted murder, it was concluded that the attack did not have xenophobic or terrorist motives due to the perpetrator's paranoid schizophrenia. After a temporary suspension following the death of the presiding judge in July 2019, the perpetrator was found not guilty by reason of mental disease based on a psychiatric evaluation in December 2019 and involuntarily committed to a closed psychiatric facility.

== Attack ==
Shortly before midnight on New Year's Eve, the perpetrator drove his car, a silver Mercedes- Benz station wagon, around the Stadtmitte borough of Bottrop. Near Osterfelder Straße, the perpetrator steered towards a pedestrian, but the man was able to avoid the vehicle. Minutes later, the man drove his car into a crowd of people at the Berliner Platz, injuring two men from Syria and Afghanistan, along with a woman and a child.

In Oberhausen, the perpetrator tried to hit a group of four people, but no one was injured. In Essen, the man tried again to drive into a crowd of people who were waiting for a bus. Police stopped the man on the Rabenhorst street, in Borbeck district.

The attack lasted 32 minutes. A total of 13 car-ramming attempts were recorded. Including the injured, around 80 people were targeted by the attacker.

== Victims ==
In total, the perpetrator injured fourteen people, four of whom are a family from Syria, composed by two daughters aged 16 and 27 and the 48-year-old father who were slightly injured, and the 46-year-old mother who was critically injured and was operated. In addition, two children, aged 4 and 10, also from Syria, and a 29-year-old woman from Afghanistan were also hit and injured. The eighth victim was a 34-year-old German man with Turkish background. No information was given for the remaining victims. One of the women was run over twice and sustained life-threatening injuries. She was stabilised following five months of surgery, but one foot was rendered paralysed.

== Perpetrator ==
The perpetrator was identified as 50-year-old Andreas N. (born December 1968), an unemployed cleaner from Essen. Throughout his arrest and custody, the man made several racist statements about "Kanaken" and "Schwarzfüße" ("black foots"). He told investigators that he had carried out the car-rammings because he wanted to "pre-empt attacks by Syrian and Afghan refugees". He referred to the victims as "crowds of kanaks" and that he targeted "non-Germans", likening his actions to "cleansing". The perpetrator also voiced frustration that refugees received social benefits and that he acted in "the interest of all Germans". Witnesses described the perpetrator as smiling happily throughout the attacks. A search of the perpetrator's phone found fourteen images, including four videos, with far-right content and Nazi imagery.

The attacker was reported to have been diagnosed with schizophrenia since 2003. He had spent time at a mental hospital in 2006 and was in and out of treatment since. He had stopped taking his medication three weeks before the attacks. The perpetrator stated that he had driven from his home to Bottrop a few hours earlier for no reason and subsequently "experienced a vision" telling him that a terror attack was planned at the city's central bus hub, where his car attacks began. The perpetrator considered his actions "a success" and said that the attacks made him feel better. He voiced no regret for the crimes, simultaneously claiming that he had stopped a terror attack and indicating that the car was being remotely controlled for "greater purpose". He was held in psychiatric holding until his trial.

Although he had initially denied his right to a lawyer, Andreas N. subsequently claimed during his trial that he didn't hate foreigners and called himself "the nicest person". According to himself, he did not remember committing the attacks or the interrogation with police. The defence stated the comments during the interrogations were just "pithy sayings".

== Reaction ==
Herbert Reul, Minister of the Interior of North Rhine-Westphalia, said about the attack that the perpetrator "wanted to kill people of foreign heritage."

After the reveal of the perpetrator's schizophrenia diagnosis, it was speculated by media that the perpetrator was subconsciously inspired by other attacks, whether right-wing terrorist, Islamist terrorist, or rampage killings, which were commonly reported in recent years. Sociologist Matthias Quent emphasised that mental illness did not exclude extremist beliefs, stating "there is no illness that causes a person to attack or kill people of color". Peter R. Neumann criticised the false dichotomy of categorising perpetrators of mass violence as only either political terrorists or mentally ill lone offenders. Britta Bannenberg and Florian Hartleb named Anders Behring Breivik and David Sonboly as examples of right-wing terrorists with mental illnesses.

== See also ==
- 2018 Münster car attack
