= 2018 Münster attack =

Vehicle-ramming attack in Germany

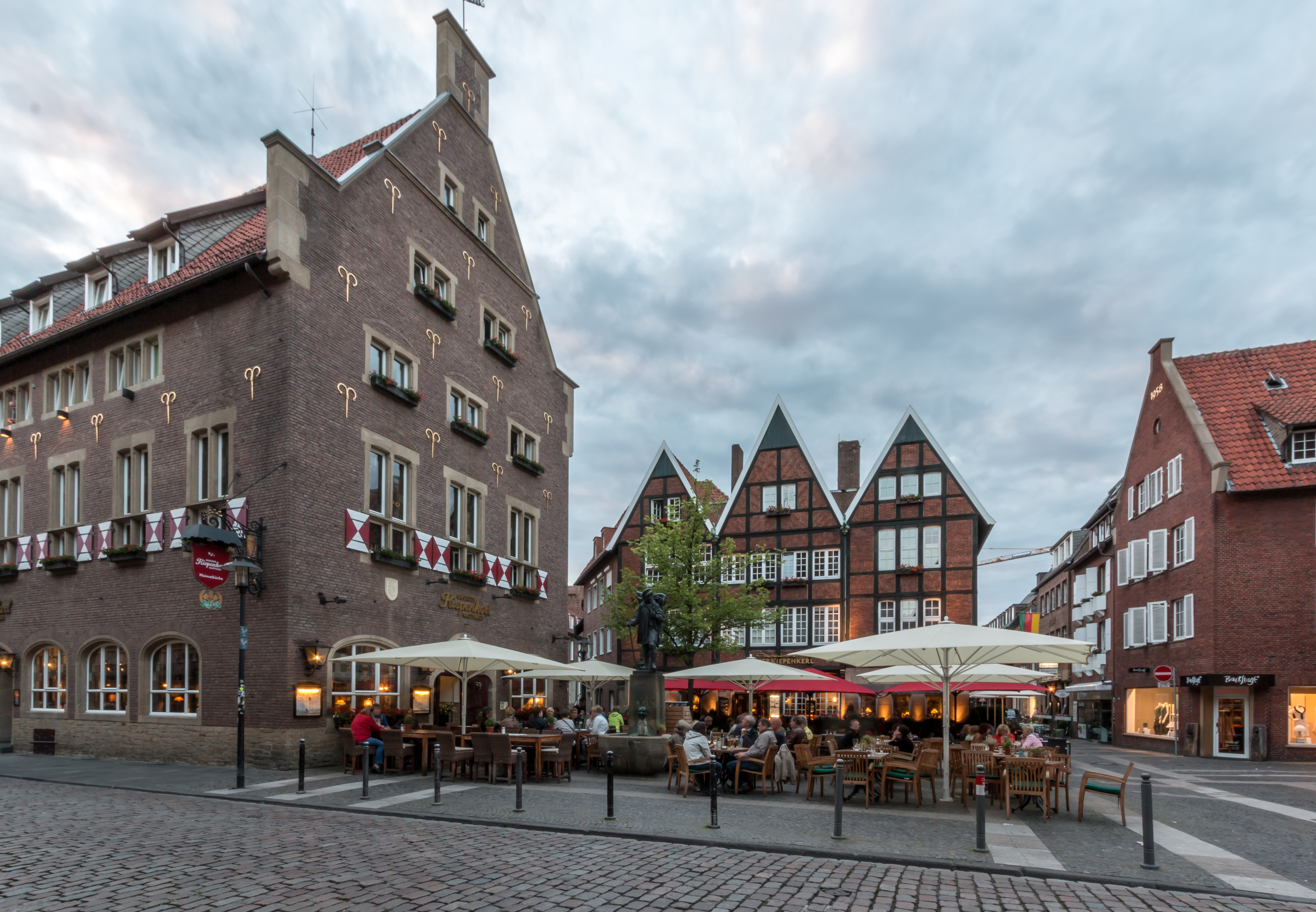

- 2018 Münster attack (North Rhine-Westphalia) 2018 Münster attack (Germany)
- Location: 51°57′51.0″N 7°37′34.5″E; Münster, North Rhine-Westphalia, Germany
- Date: 7 April 2018; 8 years ago 15:27 CEST (13:27 UTC)
- Attack type: Vehicle-ramming attack
- Weapon: Volkswagen California
- Deaths: 5 (including the perpetrator)
- Injuries: 20
- Perpetrator: Jens Alexander Rüther

Location of the attack

On 7 April 2018, a vehicle-ramming attack took place in a pedestrianised square in the old part of Münster, North Rhine-Westphalia, Germany. Four people were killed and twenty others were injured before the perpetrator committed suicide by gunshot.

== Attack ==
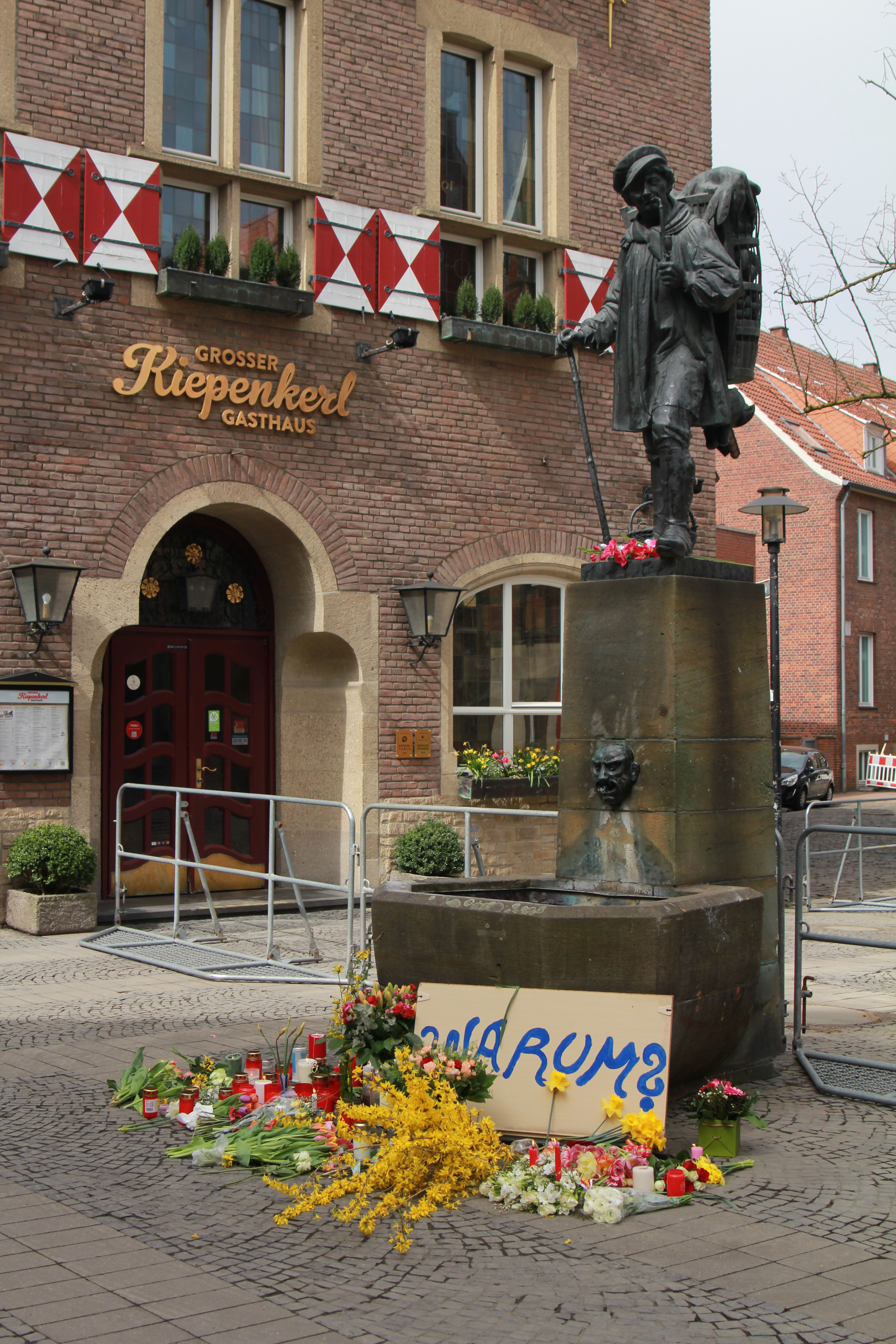
Tributes at the spot where the attack took place, the sign translates to "WHY?"

Police said the attacker drove a campervan into "several cafe and restaurant terraces in a major square in the centre of Münster". The perpetrator then shot himself dead. It was then found that his van was booby-trapped with a pistol connected to a wire.

The attack initially killed three people, including the perpetrator, and also injured about 20 others, six seriously. Another victim died on 26 April. A Dutch victim who was in a coma after the attack died almost four months later on 29 July.

Prior to the attack, Münster was planning to install security bollards in public areas, although the list of public spaces regarded as high-risk and slated to receive bollards did not include the location of this attack.

== Perpetrator ==
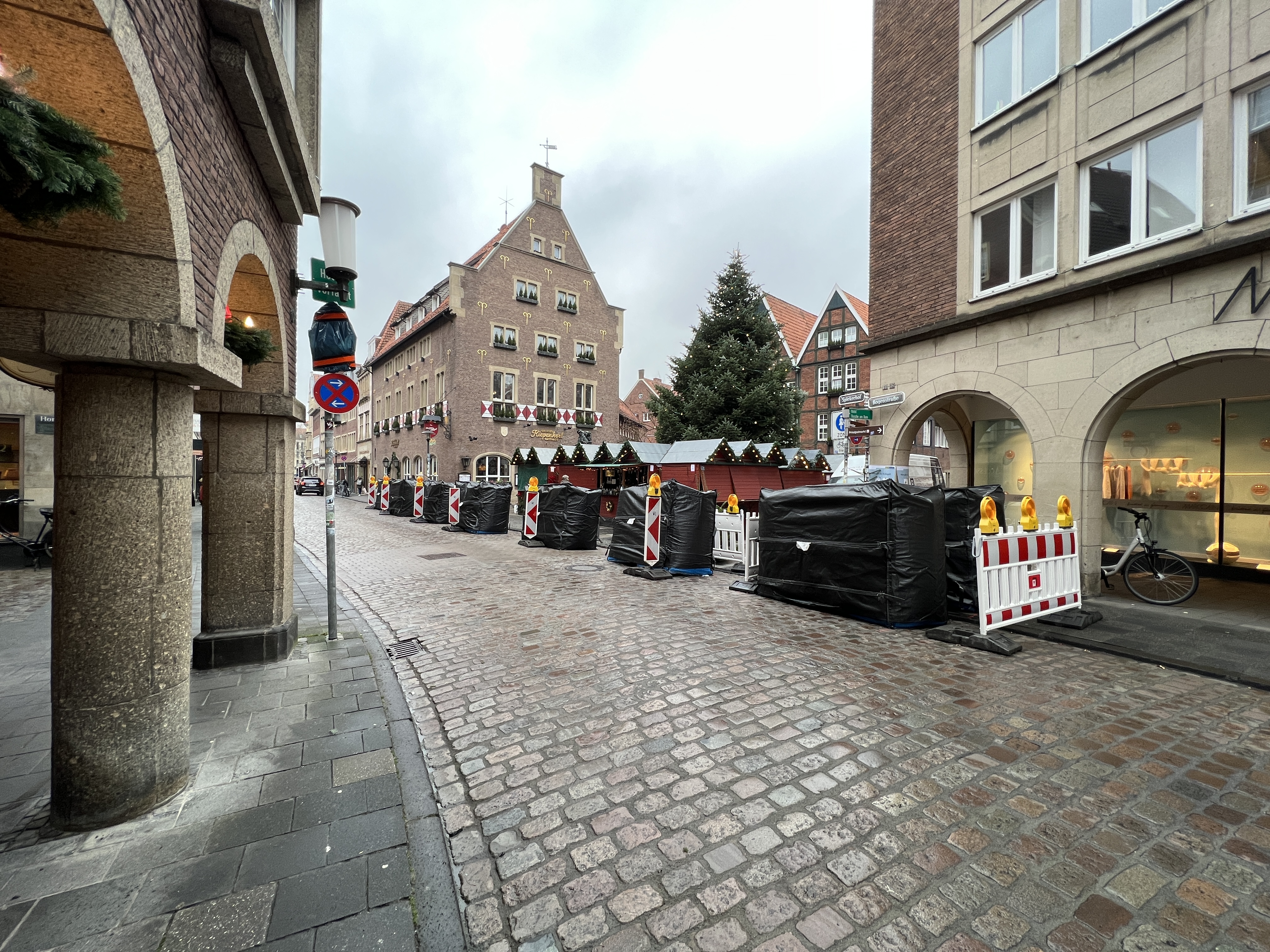
In November 2021, the site was secured with road barriers.

The attacker was identified by media sources as a 48-year-old German national named Jens Alexander Rüther, born about "an hour south" of the city, who had previously suffered from psychiatric illness.

Media reported that Rüther was born on 1 May 1969 and had resided in Münster. Deutsche Welle described him as a "wealthy designer." He was later known as small-time criminal, who stole cell phones and car radios to finance his drug addiction. Local reports claimed that he had been in contact with certain far-right groups but had not been an extremist himself. He had said in the past that he wanted to commit suicide in a spectacular way. Authorities also considered the possibility that he committed the crime due to relationship problems.

He came from the Sauerland, grew up in Madfeld and graduated from high school Petrinum Brilon. There had been five criminal proceedings against Jens Ruther, three of them at the public prosecutor's office Münster and two at the Arnsberg public prosecutor's office. The proceedings in Arnsberg dealt with two “family disputes” from 2014 and 2016. In Münster, he was accused of hit and run (2015), criminal damage (2015) and fraud (2016). All proceedings were terminated due to insufficient suspicion.

State Interior Minister Herbert Reul said on the day of the attack that there was no indication of an Islamist background of the attack. On 18 April, Reul said that after an analysis by the security authorities, right-wing extremism was also ruled out as a motive. He said that, rather, the crime "had to do with the life" of the perpetrator and his "assignment of guilt".

The crime was judged as extended suicide for personal reasons.

== Reactions ==
Chancellor Angela Merkel said she was "deeply shocked" about the crime. President Frank-Walter Steinmeier expressed his condolences to the victims and relatives. Donald Trump and Vladimir Putin condemned the crime and offered their sympathies. A public memorial service was held on the following Sunday.

== See also ==
- 2016 Berlin truck attack
