= Abu Walaa =

Iraqi Salafist preacher (born 1984)

Ahmad Abdulaziz Abdullah Abdullah (Arabic: أحمد عبد العزيز عبد الله عبد الله, romanized: Aḥmad ʿAbd al-ʿAzīz ʿAbd Allāh ʿAbd Allāh; born 1984), better known as Abu Walaa (Arabic: أبو ولاء, romanized: Abū Walāʾ), is an Islamic preacher and ISIS recruiter based in Hildesheim, Germany. In 2016 he was arrested for supporting terrorism.

== Biography ==
Born in al-Tamim, Iraq, he immigrated to Germany in 2001. Despite having no formal qualifications, he preached at the Deutschsprachiger Islamkreis Hildesheim e. V. (DIK) mosque founded in 2012, and took part as a speaker in a great number of Salafi events due to his popularity through his online video releases and his Facebook followers. He became known as a "preacher without face" (German: Prediger ohne Gesicht), because in many of his videos, his face would be hidden from the camera.

== Arrest ==
On the morning of November 8, 2016, the German SEK stormed the Mosque in Hildesheim and subsequently arrested Abu Walaa in Bad Salzdetfurth, alongside four suspected accomplices in Hildesheim and North Rhine-Westphalia accused of supporting a foreign terrorist organization according to article 129b of the German Penal Code.

He is suspected of being the head of an Islamic group, recruiting young Muslims in Germany to fight for jihad in Syria and Iraq for the Islamic State of Iraq and the Levant (ISIL or ISIS). The German authorities had long been investigating his activities. Based on testimony by Turkish-German Anil O., a young man fighting in Syria and arrested upon his return to Germany, the German prosecutor's office demanded Abu Walaa's arrest after Anil O. admitted he was influenced by Abu Walaa at his Hildesheim mosque for jihad.

== Conviction ==
Abu Walaa was convicted of support and membership in a terrorist organisation on 24 February 2021 by the Oberlandesgericht in Celle. He was sentenced to 10.5 years in prison.
